

Deaths in August

 8: Daniel Jarque
 24: Toni Sailer
 29: Frank Gardner

Current sporting seasons

Australian rules football 2009

Australian Football League

Auto racing 2009

Formula One
Sprint Cup
IRL IndyCar Series
World Rally Championship
Formula Two
Nationwide Series
Camping World Truck Series
GP2
WTTC
V8 Supercar
American Le Mans
Le Mans Series
Superleague Formula
Rolex Sports Car Series
FIA GT Championship
Formula Three
World Series by Renault
Deutsche Tourenwagen Masters
Super GT

Baseball 2009

Major League Baseball
Nippon Professional Baseball

Basketball 2009

WNBA
NBA
NCAA Division I men
NCAA Division I women

Philippine collegiate:
NCAA
UAAP

Canadian football 2009

Canadian Football League

Football (soccer) 2009

National teams competitions
2010 FIFA World Cup Qualifying
International clubs competitions
UEFA (Europe) Champions League
Europa League

AFC (Asia) Champions League
CAF (Africa) Champions League
CONCACAF (North & Central America) Champions League

Domestic (national) competitions
Argentina
Australia
Brazil
England
France
Germany

Italy
Japan
Norway
Russia
Scotland
Spain
Major League Soccer (USA & Canada)

Golf 2009

European Tour
PGA Tour
LPGA Tour
Champions Tour

Lacrosse 2009

Major League Lacrosse

Motorcycle racing 2009

Superbike World Championship
Supersport racing

Rugby league 2009

Super League
NRL

Rugby union 2009

Top 14

Currie Cup
Air New Zealand Cup

Days of the month

August 31, 2009 (Monday)

Cycling
Vuelta a España:
Stage 3 – Zutphen (Netherlands) to Venlo (Netherlands), 185 km: (1) Greg Henderson  (Team Columbia-HTC) 4h 41' 01" (2) Borut Božič  (Vacansoleil Pro Cycling Team) s.t. (3) Óscar Freire  s.t.
General Classification: (1) Fabian Cancellara  (Team Saxo Bank) 9h 29' 33" (2) Henderson + 6" (3) Gerald Ciolek  + 8"

Football (soccer)
Women's Euro in Finland: (teams in bold advance to the quarterfinals)
Group C:
 0–2 
 1–1 
Standings: Sweden 7 points, Italy 6, England 4, Russia 0.
Nehru Cup Final in New Delhi:
 1–1 (ET) . India win 5–4 in penalty shootout.

Tennis
U.S. Open, day 1: (seeding in parentheses)
Men's Singles, first round:
Roger Federer  [1] def. Devin Britton  6–1, 6–3, 7–5
Andy Roddick  [5] def. Björn Phau  6–1 6–4 6–2
Nikolay Davydenko  [8] def. Dieter Kindlmann  6–3, 6–4, 7–5
Women's Singles, first round:
Serena Williams  [2] def. Alexa Glatch  6–4, 6–1
Venus Williams  [3] def. Vera Dushevina  6–7(5) 7–5 6–3
Vera Zvonareva  [7] def. Nuria Llagostera Vives  6–0, 6–4
Victoria Azarenka  [8] def. Alexandra Dulgheru  6–1, 6–1
Flavia Pennetta  [10] def. Edina Gallovits  6–0, 6–4

August 30, 2009 (Sunday)

Auto racing
Formula One:
Belgian Grand Prix in Spa, Belgium:
(1) Kimi Räikkönen  (Ferrari) 1:23:50.995 (2) Giancarlo Fisichella  (Force India–Mercedes) +0.939 (3) Sebastian Vettel  (Red Bull–Renault) +3.875
Drivers' standings (after 12 of 17 races): (1) Jenson Button  (Brawn-Mercedes) 72 points (2) Rubens Barrichello  (Brawn-Mercedes) 56 (3) Vettel (Red Bull-Renault) 53
Constructors' standings: (1) Brawn-Mercedes 128 (2) Red Bull-Renault 104.5 (3)  Ferrari 56
Nationwide Series:
NAPA Auto Parts 200 in Montreal, Quebec:
 (1) Carl Edwards  (Ford, Roush Fenway Racing) (2) Marcos Ambrose  (Toyota, JTG Daugherty Racing) (3) Andrew Ranger  (Toyota, CJM Racing)

Baseball
Little League World Series in South Williamsport, Pennsylvania:
Final: Chula Vista, California 6, Taoyuan City, Chinese Taipei 3

Basketball
Americas Championship in San Juan, Puerto Rico: (teams in bold advance to the quarterfinals)
Group A:
 54–49 
 90–70 
Standings: Puerto Rico 8 points, Uruguay 7, Canada 6, Mexico 5, Virgin Islands 4.
Group B:
 84–64 
 89–87(OT) 
Standings: Brazil 8 points, Argentina, Dominican Republic 6, Panama, Venezuela 5.
EuroBasket qualification additional qualifying round, final series second leg: (first leg score in parentheses)
 92–54 (66–70) . France win 158–124 on aggregate.
France qualify for EuroBasket 2009.

Cricket
New Zealand in Sri Lanka:
2nd Test in Colombo, day 5:
 416 & 311/5d;  234 & 397 (123.5 ov, Daniel Vettori 140). Sri Lanka win by 96 runs, Sri Lanka win the 2-match series 2–0.
Australia in England:
1st Twenty20 in Manchester:
 145/4 (20/20 ov);  4/2 (1.1/20 ov). No result, 2-match series level 0–0.
Afghanistan in Netherlands:
1st ODI in Amstelveen:
 188 (47 ov);  180 (49.5 ov). Netherlands win by 8 runs, Netherlands lead the 2-match series 1–0.

Cycling
Vuelta a España:
Stage 2 – Assen (Netherlands) to Emmen (Netherlands), 202 km: (1) Gerald Ciolek  4h 43' 12" (2) Fabio Sabatini  s.t. (3) Roger Hammond  (Cervélo TestTeam) s.t.
General Classification: (1) Fabian Cancellara  (Team Saxo Bank) 4h 48' 32" (2) Ciolek + 8" (3) Tom Boonen  + 9"

Field hockey
Men's EuroHockey Nations Championship in Amstelveen, Netherlands:
Fifth to eighth place classification:
 5–4 
 7–0 
Standings: Belgium 9 points, France 6, Austria 3, Poland 0.
Austria and Poland are relegated to EuroHockey Nations Trophy in 2011.
Third and fourth place:
  6–1 
Final:
  5–3  
England win the title for the first time.

Football (soccer)
Women's Euro in Finland: (teams in bold advance to the quarterfinals)
Group B:
 1–0 
 1–1 
Standings: Germany 9 points, France, Norway 4, Iceland 0.
CAF Champions League group stage, round 4:
Group A:
ZESCO United  0–0  Al-Merreikh
Kano Pillars  2–1  Al-Hilal
Standings: Al-Hilal, Kano Pillars 7 points, ZESCO United 5, Al-Merreikh 2.

Golf
PGA Tour:
FedEx Cup Playoffs:
The Barclays in Jersey City, New Jersey
 Winner: Heath Slocum  275 (−9)
European Tour:
Johnnie Walker Championship at Gleneagles in Auchterarder, Scotland
 Winner: Peter Hedblom  275 (−13)
LPGA Tour:
Safeway Classic in North Plains, Oregon
 Winner: M. J. Hur  203 (−13) PO
 Hur wins her first LPGA tour title, eliminating Michele Redman  on the first playoff hole and Suzann Pettersen  on the second.
U.S. Amateur in Tulsa, Oklahoma:
An Byeong-hun  becomes the youngest person ever to win the event, at age 17.

Judo
World Championships in Rotterdam:
Men's 100 kg:  Maxim Rakov   Henk Grol   Ramadan Darwish  & Takamasa Anai 
Men's +100 kg:  Teddy Riner   Óscar Brayson   Abdullo Tangriev  & Marius Paskevicius 
Women's +78 kg:  Tong Wen   Karina Bryant   Idalys Ortiz  & Maki Tsukada

Motorcycle racing
Moto GP:
Indianapolis Grand Prix in Speedway, Indiana, United States:
(1) Jorge Lorenzo  (Yamaha) 47:13.592 (2) Alex de Angelis  (Honda) +9.435 (3) Nicky Hayden  (Ducati) +12.947
Riders' standings (after 12 of 17 races): (1) Valentino Rossi  (Yamaha) 212 points (2) Lorenzo 187 (3) Casey Stoner  (Ducati) 150
Manufacturers' standings: (1) Yamaha 280 points (2) Honda 204 (3) Ducati 182

Rowing
World Championships in Lake Malta, Poznań, Poland:
Men:
Lightweight double sculls:  Storm Uru/Peter Taylor  6:10.62  Jérémie Azou/Frédéric Dufour  6:12.57  Marcello Miani/Elia Luini  6:15.08
Lightweight quad:   5:50.77   5:51.02   5:52.70
Quadruple sculls:   5:38.33   5:39.66   5:39.85
Eight:   5:24.13   5:27.15   5:28.32
Women:
Lightweight double sculls:  Christina Giazitzidou/Alexandra Tsiavou  6:51.46  Magdalena Kemnitz/Agnieszka Renc  6:56.65  Hester Goodsell/Sophie Hosking  6:56.67
Quadruple sculls:   6:18.41   6:21.54   6:24.27
Eight:   6:05.34   6:06.94   6:07.43

August 29, 2009 (Saturday)

Auto racing
IndyCar Series:
Peak Antifreeze & Motor Oil Indy 300 in Joliet, Illinois:
(1) Ryan Briscoe  (Penske Racing) (2) Scott Dixon  (Chip Ganassi Racing) (3) Mario Moraes  (KV Racing)
Drivers' standings (after 15 of 17 races): (1) Briscoe 550 points (2) Dario Franchitti  (Chip Ganassi Racing) 525 (3) Dixon 517

Basketball
Americas Championship in San Juan, Puerto Rico: (teams in bold advance to the quarterfinals)
Group A:
 80–63 
 69–71 
Standings: Puerto Rico 6 points (3 games), Uruguay, Canada 5 (3), Mexico 4 (3), Virgin Islands 4 (4).
Group B:
 78–73 
 55–80 
Standings: Brazil 6 points (3 matches), Dominican Republic 5 (3), Venezuela 5 (4), Argentina, Panama 4 (3).

Cricket
New Zealand in Sri Lanka:
2nd Test in Colombo, day 4:
 416 & 311/5d (Kumar Sangakkara 109);  234 & 182/6 (56.0 ov). New Zealand require another 312 runs with 4 wickets remaining.

Cycling
Vuelta a España:
Stage 1 – Assen (Netherlands), 4.5 km (ITT): (1) Fabian Cancellara  (Team Saxo Bank) 5' 28" (2) Tom Boonen  + 9" (3) Tyler Farrar  (Garmin–Slipstream) + 12"

Field hockey
Women's EuroHockey Nations Championship in Amstelveen, Netherlands:
Fifth to eighth place classification:
 1–1 
 3–1 
Standings: Ireland 5 points, Azerbaijan 4, Russia 3, Scotland 2.
Russia and Scotland are relegated to EuroHockey Nations Trophy in 2011.
Third and fourth place:
 1–2  
Final:
  3–2  
Netherlands win the title for the seventh time.

Football (soccer)
Women's Euro in Finland: (teams in bold advance to the quarterfinals)
Group A:
 0–1 
 1–2 
Standings: Finland, Netherlands 6 points, Denmark, Ukraine 3.
CAF Champions League group stage, round 4:
Group B:
Monomotapa United  0–2  TP Mazembe
Etoile du Sahel  0–0  Heartland
Standings: TP Mazembe 9 points, Heartland 7, ES Sahel 4, Monomotapa 3.
Nehru Cup in New Delhi:
 0–1 
Standings: Syria 12 points (4 matches), India 6 (4), Kyrgyzstan, Lebanon 4 (4), Sri Lanka 3 (4).
Syria and India advance to the final.

Judo
World Championships in Rotterdam:
Men's 90 kg:  Lee Kyu-Won   Kirill Denisov   Hesham Mesbah  & Dilshod Choriev 
Women's 70 kg:  Yuri Alvear   Anett Meszaros   Mina Watanabe  & Houda Miled 
Women's 78 kg:  Marhinde Verkerk   Marina Pryschepa   Heide Wollert  & Yi Sun

Rugby union
Tri Nations Series:
 25–32  in Perth
Standings after 4 matches: South Africa 17 points,  8, Australia 3.

Shooting
World Running Target Championships in Heinola, Finland:
Men's 50 metre running target:  Maxim Stepanov  596 EWR  Krister Holmberg  590  Peter Pelach  589

Tennis
ATP World Tour:
Pilot Pen Tennis in New Haven, Connecticut, United States:
Fernando Verdasco  def. Sam Querrey  6–4, 7–6 (6)
Verdasco wins his first title of the year and third of his career.
WTA Tour:
Pilot Pen Tennis in New Haven, Connecticut, United States:
Caroline Wozniacki  def. Elena Vesnina  6–2, 6–4
Wozniacki wins her second consecutive title at this tournament, for her third title of the year, and the sixth of her career.

August 28, 2009 (Friday)

Athletics
Golden League:
Weltklasse Zürich in Zürich, Switzerland: (GL indicates Golden League event, athletes in bold are in contention for the US$1 million jackpot)
Men:
100 Metres GL:  Usain Bolt  9.81
400 Metres GL:  LaShawn Merritt  44.21
800 Metres:  David Rudisha  1:43.52
1500 Metres:  Augustine Kiprono Choge  3:33.38
5000 Metres GL:  Kenenisa Bekele  12:52.32
3000 Metres Steeplechase:  Ezekiel Kemboi  8:04.44
110 Metres Hurdles GL:  Dwight Thomas  13.16
Triple Jump:  Nelson Évora  17.38
Javelin Throw GL:  Andreas Thorkildsen  91.28
4x100 Metres Relay:   37.70
Women:
100 Metres GL:  Carmelita Jeter  10.86
400 Metres GL:  Sanya Richards  48.94
1500 Metres:  Maryam Yusuf Jamal  3:59.15
100 Metres Hurdles GL:  Brigitte Foster-Hylton  12.46
High Jump GL:  Blanka Vlašić  2.01
Pole Vault GL:  Elena Isinbaeva  5.06 (WR)
Isinbayeva sets a world record for the 17th time.

Basketball
Americas Championship in San Juan, Puerto Rico: (teams in bold advance to the quarterfinals)
Group A:
 67–87 
 54–71 
Standings: Puerto Rico 6 points (3 games), Canada 4 (2), Uruguay 3 (2), Virgin Islands 3 (3), Mexico 2 (2)
Group B:
 67–76 
 71–80 
Standings: Brazil 6 points (3 matches), Venezuela 4 (3), Dominican Republic, Panama 3 (2), Argentina 2 (2).

Cricket
New Zealand in Sri Lanka:
2nd Test in Colombo, day 3:
 416 & 157/2 (45.2 ov);  234. Sri Lanka lead by 339 runs with 8 wickets remaining.
Australia in England:
 v  in Edinburgh:
 345 (50 ov, David Hussey 111);  156 (39.3 ov). Australia win by 189 runs.

Field hockey
Men's EuroHockey Nations Championship in Amstelveen, Netherlands:
Fifth to eighth place classification:
 2–3 
 5–0 
Standings: Belgium, France 6 points, Austria, Poland 0.
Austria and Poland are relegated to EuroHockey Nations Trophy in 2011.
Semifinals:
 2–1(ET) 
 2–1

Football (soccer)
Women's Euro in Finland: (teams in bold advance to the quarterfinals)
Group C:
 0–2 
 3–2 
Standings: Sweden 6 points, Italy, England 3, Russia 0.
UEFA Super Cup in Monaco:
Barcelona  1–0 (ET)  Shakhtar Donetsk
Pedro scores the goal in the 115th minute.
Nehru Cup in New Delhi:
 1–4 
Standings: Syria 9 points (3 matches), India 6 (3), Kyrgyzstan, Lebanon 4 (4), Sri Lanka 3 (4).
Syria and India advance to the final.

Judo
World Championships in Rotterdam:
Men's 81 kg:  Ivan Nifontov   Siarhei Shundzikau   Kim Jae-Bum  & Ole Bischof 
Women's 63 kg:  Yoshie Ueno   Elisabeth Willeboordse   Claudia Malzahn  & Alice Schlesinger

August 27, 2009 (Thursday)

Basketball
Americas Championship in San Juan, Puerto Rico: (teams in bold advance to the quarterfinals)
Group A:
 95–40 
 85–74 
Standings: Puerto Rico 4 points (2 games), Canada, Uruguay 2 (1), Virgin Islands, Mexico 2 (2)
Group B:
 87–100 
 87–67 
Standings: Brazil 4 points (2 games), Dominican Republic, Venezuela 3 (2), Panama, Argentina 1 (1).
EuroBasket qualification additional qualifying round, final series first leg:
 70–66

Cricket
New Zealand in Sri Lanka:
2nd Test in Colombo, day 2:
 416 (Thilan Samaraweera 143);  159/5 (47.0 ov). New Zealand trail by 257 runs with 5 wickets remaining in the 1st innings.
England in Ireland:
Only ODI in Belfast:
 203/9 (50.0 ov);  113/9 (20.0/20 ov). England win by 2 runs (D/L method).

Field hockey
Women's EuroHockey Nations Championship in Amstelveen, Netherlands:
Fifth to eighth place classification:
 1–1 
 1–2 
Standings: Ireland 4 points, Russia, Scotland 2, Azerbaijan 1.
Semifinals:
 5–1 
 1–2(ET) 

Football (soccer)
Women's Euro in Finland: (teams in bold advance to the quarterfinals)
Group B:
 1–5 
 0–1 Standings: Germany 6 points, France, Norway 3, Iceland 0.
Copa Sudamericana First Stage, second leg: (first leg score in parentheses)Emelec  2–1 (1–0)  Zamora. Emelec win 3–1 on aggregate.River Plate  2–1 (3–0)  Blooming. River Plate win 5–1 on aggregate.
CONCACAF Champions League Group Stage, round 2:
Group 4:
W Connection  1–2  Comunicaciones
Real España  1–5  UNAM
Nehru Cup in New Delhi: 1–0 
Standings: Syria 9 points (3 matches), India 6 (3), Lebanon 4 (4), Sri Lanka 3 (3), Kyrgyzstan 1 (3).
Syria advance to the final.

Judo
World Championships in Rotterdam:
Men's 73 kg:  Wang Ki-Chun   Kim Chol Su   Mansur Isaev  & Dirk Van Tichelt 
Women's 52 kg:  Misato Nakamura   Yanet Bermoy   Ana Carrascosa  & Romy Tarangul 
Women's 57 kg:  Morgane Ribout   Telma Monteiro   Kifayat Gasimova  Hedvig Karakas 

Shooting
World Running Target Championships in Heinola, Finland:
Men's 50 metre running target mixed:  Maxim Stepanov  392+37  Staffan Holmström  392+36  Niklas Bergström  391

August 26, 2009 (Wednesday)

Basketball
Americas Championship in San Juan, Puerto Rico:
Group A:
 62–88 
 66–81 
Group B:
 68–81 
 85–69 

Cricket
New Zealand in Sri Lanka:
2nd Test in Colombo, day 1:
 262/3 (90.0 ov)
Daniel Vettori gets his 300th Test wicket.
ICC Intercontinental Cup:
 v  in Amstelveen, day 3:
 181 & 132;  107 & 209/9 (89.3 ov; Edgar Schiferli 5/57). Afghanistan win by 1 wicket.
Standings (2 matches unless stated otherwise): Scotland 29 points, Kenya, Afghanistan 23, Netherlands 15, Ireland 12, Zimbabwe XI 3 (1), Canada 3 (3).

Field hockey
Men's EuroHockey Nations Championship in Amstelveen, Netherlands: (teams in bold advance to the semifinals)
Pool A:
 2–8  3–1 
Standings: England, Germany 7 points, Belgium 3, Austria 0.
Pool B: 6–1 
 0–6 Standings: Spain 9 points, Netherlands 6, France 3, Poland 0.

Football (soccer)
Women's Euro in Finland: (teams in bold advance to the quarterfinals)
Group A:
 1–2 
 1–2 Standings: Finland 6 points, Netherlands, Denmark 3, Ukraine 0.
UEFA Champions League Play-off round, second leg: (first leg score in parentheses, the winners advance to the group stage, the losers go to Europa League group stage)
Champions Path:Olympiacos  1–0 (2–0)  Sheriff Tiraspol. Olympiacos win 3–0 on aggregate.APOEL  3–1 (0–1)  Copenhagen. APOEL win 3–2 on aggregate.
Non-Champions Path:Arsenal  3–1 (2–0)  Celtic. Arsenal win 5–1 on aggregate.Stuttgart  0–0 (2–0)  Timişoara. Stuttgart win 2–0 on aggregate.Fiorentina  1–1 (2–2)  Sporting CP. 3–3 on aggregate, Fiorentina win on away goals rule.
Copa Sudamericana First Stage, first leg:
Atlético Mineiro  1–1  Goiás
Copa Sudamericana First Stage, second leg: (first leg score in parentheses)
Flamengo  1–1 (0–0)  Fluminense 1–1 on aggregate, Fluminense win on away goals rule.
CONCACAF Champions League Group Stage, round 2:
Group 1:
Árabe Unido  1–1  Houston Dynamo
Group 2:
D.C. United  1–3  Toluca
Marathón  3–1  San Juan Jabloteh
Group 3:
Cruz Azul  5–0  Columbus Crew
Nehru Cup in New Delhi:
 3–1 
Standings: Syria 6 points (2 matches), India 6 (3), Lebanon 4 (3), Sri Lanka 3 (3), Kyrgyzstan 1 (3).
News:
The Italian football system will be shaken up as Serie A will break away from the system to form a new league akin to England's Premier League for the 2010–11 campaign, citing higher television rights as the main reason.

Judo
World Championships in Rotterdam:
Men's 60 kg:  Georgii Zantaraia   Hiroaki Hiraoka   Hovhannes Davtyan  & Elio Verde 
Men's 66 kg:  Khashbaataryn Tsagaanbaatar   Sugoi Uriarte   Miklós Ungvari  & An Jeong-Hwan 
Women's 48 kg:  Tomoko Fukumi   Oiana Blanco   Chung Jung-Yeon  & Frédérique Jossinet 

Shooting
World Running Target Championships in Heinola, Finland:
Men's 10 metre running target:
Gold medal match: Emil Martinsson  def. Vladyslav Prianishnikov  6–2
Bronze medal match: Dimitry Romanov  def. Krister Holmberg  6–3
Women's 10 metre running target:
Gold medal match: Galina Avramenko  def. Tetyana Yevseyenko  6–5
Bronze medal match: Viktoriya Zabolotna  def. Olga Stepanova  6–4

August 25, 2009 (Tuesday)

Basketball
Oceanian Championship, second leg: (first leg score in parentheses) 100–78 (77–84) . New Zealand win 177–162 on aggregate.
Both teams qualify for 2010 FIBA World Championship.

Cricket
ICC Intercontinental Cup:
 v  in Amstelveen, day 2:
 181 & 132;  107 & 39/2 (18.0 ov). Afghanistan require another 168 runs with 8 wickets remaining.

Cycling
UCI ProTour:
Tour of Benelux:
Stage 7 (ITT): (1) Edvald Boasson Hagen  (Team Columbia-HTC) 16' 07" (2) Sebastian Langeveld  + 4" (3) Maarten Tjallingii  (Rabobank) + 5"
Final General classification: (1) Hagen 26h 49' 40" (2) Sylvain Chavanel  + 45" (3) Langeveld + 47"

Field hockey
Women's EuroHockey Nations Championship in Amstelveen, Netherlands: (teams in bold advance to the semifinals)
Pool A:
 1–4  9–0 
Standings: Netherlands 9 points, England 6, Russia, Azerbaijan 1.
Pool B:
 1–4  4–0 
Standings: Germany 9 points, Spain 6, Scotland, Ireland 1.

Football (soccer)
Women's Euro in Finland:
Group C:
 1–2 
 3–0 
UEFA Champions League Play-off round, second leg: (first leg score in parentheses, the winners advance to the group stage, the losers go to Europa League group stage)
Champions Path:Maccabi Haifa  3–0 (2–1)  Red Bull Salzburg. Maccabi Haifa win 5–1 on aggrehate.Zürich  2–1 (3–0)  Ventspils. Zürich win 5–1 on aggregate.Debrecen  2–0 (2–1)  Levski Sofia. Debrecen win 4–1 on aggregate.
Non-Champions Path:
Anderlecht  1–3 (1–5)  Lyon. Lyon win 8–2 on aggregate.Atlético Madrid  2–0 (3–2)  Panathinaikos. Atlético Madrid win 5–2 on aggregate.
UEFA Europa League play-off round, second leg: (first leg score in parentheses, the winners advance to the group stage)Shakhtar Donetsk  2–0 (3–0)  Sivasspor. Shakhtar win 5–0 on aggregate.
Copa Sudamericana First Stage, second leg: (first leg score in parentheses)Unión Española  1–0 (2–2)  La Equidad. Unión Española win 3–2 on aggregate.
Coritiba  2–0 (0–2)  Vitória. 2–2 on aggregate, Vitória win 5–3 in penalty shootout.
Libertad  1–1 (0–1)  LDU Quito. LDU Quito win 2–1 on aggregate.
CONCACAF Champions League Group Stage, round 2:
Group 1:
Pachuca  5–0  Isidro Metapán
Group 3:
Saprissa  3–1  Puerto Rico Islanders
Nehru Cup in New Delhi:
 1–1 
Standings: Syria 6 points (2 matches), Lebanon 4 (3), India, Sri Lanka 3 (2), Kyrgyzstan 1 (3).

August 24, 2009 (Monday)

Cricket
ICC Intercontinental Cup:
 v  in Amstelveen, day 1:
 181;  107 (36.5 ov). Afghanistan trail by 74 runs after the 1st innings.

Cycling
UCI ProTour:
Tour of Benelux:
Stage 6: (1) Edvald Boasson Hagen  3h 28' 58" (2) Matthew Goss  s.t. (3) Tyler Farrar  s.t.
General classification: (1) Boasson Hagen 26h 33' 33" (2) Farrar + 21" (3) Lars Bak  + 25"

Field hockey
Men's EuroHockey Nations Championship in Amstelveen, Netherlands:
Pool A:
 3–0 
 4–4 
Standings after 2 matches: Germany, England 4 points, Belgium 3, Austria 0.
Pool B:
 2–3 
 0–3 Standings after 2 matches: Spain 6 points, Netherlands, France 3, Poland 0.

Football (soccer)
Women's Euro in Finland:
Group B:
 4–0 
 1–3 
Nehru Cup in New Delhi:
 4–0 
Standings after 2 matches: Syria 6 points, Lebanon, India, Sri Lanka 3, Kyrgyzstan 0.

Shooting
World Running Target Championships in Heinola, Finland:
Men's 10 metre running target mixed:  Dimitry Romanov  388  Miroslav Januš  387  Maxim Stepanov  384
Women's 10 metre running target mixed:  Natalya Gurova  376  Viktoriya Zabolotna  375  Olga Stepanova  373

August 23, 2009 (Sunday)

Athletics
World Championships in Berlin, Germany:
Women's Marathon:  Bai Xue  2:25:15  Yoshimi Ozaki  2:25:25  Aselefech Mergia  2:25:32
Women's long jump:  Brittney Reese  7.10  Tatyana Lebedeva  6.97  Karin Mey Melis  6.80
Men's javelin throw:  Andreas Thorkildsen  89.59  Guillermo Martinez  86.41  Yukifumi Murakami  82.97
Men's 5000 metres:  Kenenisa Bekele  13:17.09  Bernard Lagat  13:17.33  James Kwalia C'Kurui  13:17.78
Bekele wins his second title of this championships and fifth overall.
Women's 1500 metres:  Maryam Yusuf Jamal  4:03.74  Lisa Dobriskey  4:03.75  Shannon Rowbury  4:04.18
Jamal wins her second 1500m title after the initial winner Natalia Rodríguez  is disqualified.
Men's 800 metres:  Mbulaeni Mulaudzi  1:45.29  Alfred Kirwa Yego  1:45.35  Yusuf Saad Kamel  1:45.35
Women's 4x400 metres relay:   3:17.83   3:21.15   3:21.64
Men's 4x400 metres relay:   2:57.86   3:00.53   3:00.90

Auto racing
Formula One:
European Grand Prix in Valencia, Spain
(1) Rubens Barrichello  (Brawn–Mercedes) 1:35:51.289 (2) Lewis Hamilton  (McLaren-Mercedes) +2.358 (3) Kimi Räikkönen  (Ferrari) +15.994
Drivers' standings (after 11 of 17 races): (1) Jenson Button  (Brawn-Mercedes) 72 points (2) Barrichello 54 (3) Mark Webber  (Red Bull–Renault) 51.5
Constructors' standings: (1) Brawn-Mercedes 126 (2) Red Bull-Renault 98.5 (3)  Ferrari 46
IndyCar Series:
Peak Antifreeze & Motor Oil Indy Grand Prix in Sonoma, California
(1) Dario Franchitti  (Chip Ganassi Racing) (2) Ryan Briscoe  (Penske Racing) (3) Mike Conway  (Dreyer & Reinbold Racing)
Drivers' standings (after 14 of 17 races): (1) Briscoe 497 points (2) Franchitti 493 (3) Scott Dixon  (Chip Ganassi Racing) 477
V8 Supercars:
Queensland House and Land.com 300 in Ipswich, Queensland
Round 16: (1) Will Davison  (Holden Commodore) (2) Craig Lowndes  (Ford Falcon) (3) Russell Ingall  (Holden Commodore)
Standings (after 13 of 26 races): (1) Jamie Whincup  (Ford Falcon) 2007 points (2) Davison 1824 (3) Garth Tander  (Holden Commodore) 1479

Basketball
Oceanian Championship, first leg:
 84–77 

Cricket
Australia in England:
The Ashes Series:
5th Test at The Oval, London, day 4:
 332 & 373/9d;  160 & 348 (102.2 ov, Michael Hussey 121). England win by 197 runs and win the 5-Test series 2–1.Kenya in Canada:
3rd ODI in King City, Ontario:Match abandoned without a ball bowled. Canada win the 3-match series 1–0.Ireland in Scotland:
2nd ODI in Aberdeen:Match abandoned without a ball bowled. Ireland win the 2-match series 1–0.Cycling
UCI ProTour:
Tour of Benelux:
Stage 5: (1) Lars Bak  (Team Saxo Bank) 5h 13' 16" (2) Edvald Boasson Hagen  (Team Columbia-HTC) + 2" (3) Francesco Gavazzi  s.t.
General classification: (1) Hagen 23h 04' 45" (2) Tyler Farrar  (Garmin-Slipstream) + 15" (3) Bak + 15"
GP Ouest-France:
(1) Simon Gerrans  (Cervelo Test Team) 5h 58' 53" (2) Pierrick Fédrigo  (Bbox Bouygues Telecom) s.t. (3) Paul Martens  s.t.

Field hockey
Men's EuroHockey Nations Championship in Amstelveen, Netherlands:
Pool A:
 5–0 
 3–1 
Women's EuroHockey Nations Championship in Amstelveen, Netherlands: (teams in bold advance to the semifinals)
Pool A: 5–0 
 1–1 
Pool B:
 0–0  2–1 

Football (soccer)
Women's Euro in Finland:
Group A:
 0–2 
 1–0 
Nehru Cup in New Delhi:
 2–1 
Standings: Syria, Sri Lanka 3 points (1 match), Lebanon, India 3 (2), Kyrgyzstan 0 (2)
Spanish Super Cup, second leg: (first leg score in parentheses)Barcelona 3–0 (2–1) Athletic Bilbao. Barcelona win 5–1 on aggregate.

Golf
LPGA Tour:
Solheim Cup in Sugar Grove, Illinois, day 3:
Final Round (singles):
Paula Creamer  defeats Suzann Pettersen  3 & 2
Angela Stanford  defeats Becky Brewerton  5 & 4
Michelle Wie  defeats Helen Alfredsson  1 up
Laura Davies  and Brittany Lang  halved
Lang comes back to halve the match after Davies was dormie with 2 holes left.
Gwladys Nocera  and Juli Inkster  halved
Catriona Matthew  defeats Kristy McPherson  3 & 2
Brittany Lincicome  defeats Sophie Gustafson  3 & 2
Diana Luna  defeats Nicole Castrale  3 & 2
Christina Kim  defeats Tania Elósegui  2 up
Maria Hjorth  and Cristie Kerr  halved
Morgan Pressel  defeats Anna Nordqvist  3 & 2
Janice Moodie  and Natalie Gulbis  halved
Gulbis comes back from 3 down after 13 holes to earn a half-point.
Final standings: Team USA  16–12  Team Europe
Team USA win the Cup for the third straight meeting, and eighth time overall.
Senior majors:
JELD-WEN Tradition in Sunriver, Oregon
 (1) Mike Reid  272 (−16) PO (2) John Cook  272 (−16) (3) Brad Bryant  274 (−14)
 Reid wins his second senior major on the first playoff hole.
PGA Tour:
Wyndham Championship in Greensboro, North Carolina
 Winner: Ryan Moore  264 (−16) PO
 Moore wins his first title on the PGA Tour in a playoff, eliminating Jason Bohn  on the first playoff hole and Kevin Stadler  on the third.
European Tour:
KLM Open in Zandvoort, Netherlands
 Winner: Simon Dyson  265 (−15) PO
 Dyson defeats Peter Hedblom  and Peter Lawrie  on the first playoff hole.

Tennis
ATP World Tour:
Western & Southern Financial Group Masters in Mason, Ohio, United States:
Final: Roger Federer  def. Novak Djokovic  6–1, 7–5
Federer wins this tournament for the third time, for his fourth title of the year and 61st overall.
WTA Tour:
Rogers Cup in Toronto, Canada:
Final: Elena Dementieva  def. Maria Sharapova  6–4, 6–3
Dementieva wins her third title of the year and 14th of her career.

Volleyball
FIVB World Grand Prix Final Round in Tokyo, Japan:
 3–1 
 3–0 
 1–3 
Final standings:  Brazil 10 points,  Russia 9,  Germany 7, Netherlands 7, China 6, Japan 6.
Brazil win the title for the eighth time.

August 22, 2009 (Saturday)

Athletics
World Championships in Berlin, Germany:
Men's Marathon:  Abel Kirui  2:06:54 (CR)  Emmanuel Kipchirchir Mutai  2:07:48  Tsegay Kebede  2:08:35
Men's long jump:  Dwight Phillips  8.54  Godfrey Khotso Mokoena  8.47  Mitchell Watt  8.37
Men's pole vault:  Steven Hooker  5.90  Romain Mesnil  5.85  Renaud Lavillenie  5.80
Women's hammer throw:  Anita Włodarczyk  77.96 WR  Betty Heidler  77.12 NR  Martina Hrašnová  74.79
Włodarczyk betters Tatyana Lysenko's record by 16 cm, and twists her ankle while celebrating.
Women's 5000 metres:  Vivian Cheruiyot  14:57.97  Sylvia Jebiwott Kibet  14:58.33  Meseret Defar  14:58.41
Women's 4x100 metres relay:   42.06   42.29   42.87
Men's 4x100 metres relay:   37.31 CR   37.62 NR   38.02
Usain Bolt completes a hat-trick of world titles, but this time without a world record.

Auto racing
Sprint Cup Series:
Sharpie 500 in Bristol, Tennessee
 (1) Kyle Busch  (Toyota, Joe Gibbs Racing) (2) Mark Martin  (Chevrolet, Hendrick Motorsports) (3) Marcos Ambrose  (Toyota, JTG Daugherty Racing)
Drivers' standings (after 24 of 26 races leading to the Chase for the Sprint Cup): (1) Tony Stewart  3564 points (Chevrolet, Stewart Haas Racing) (2) Jimmie Johnson  3344 (Chevrolet, Hendrick Motorsports) (3) Jeff Gordon  3310 (Chevrolet, Hendrick Motorsports)
 One week after Stewart clinched his spot in the 2009 Chase, Johnson and Gordon join him.
V8 Supercars:
Queensland House and Land.com 300 in Ipswich, Queensland
Round 15: (1) Jamie Whincup  (Ford Falcon) (2) James Courtney  (Ford Falcon) (3) Mark Winterbottom  (Ford Falcon)
Standings (after 13 of 26 races): (1) Whincup 1941 points (2) Will Davison  (Holden Commodore) 1674 (3) Garth Tander  (Holden Commodore) 1416

Cricket
Australia in England:
The Ashes Series:
5th Test at The Oval, London, day 3:
 332 & 373/9d (Jonathan Trott 119);  160 & 80/0 (20 ov). Australia require 466 runs with 10 wickets remaining.
New Zealand in Sri Lanka:
1st Test in Colombo, day 5:
 452 & 259/4d;  299 & 210 (71.5 ov). Sri Lanka win by 202 runs, lead 2-match series 1–0.Ireland in Scotland:
1st ODI in Aberdeen:
 205/9 (50 ov);  109 (40.3 ov). Ireland win by 96 runs, lead 2-match series 1–0.Kenya in Canada:
2nd ODI in King City, Ontario:
 63/3 (17.1/33 ov). No result, Canada lead 3-match series 1–0.Cycling
UCI ProTour:
Tour of Benelux:
Stage 4: (1) Tyler Farrar  (Garmin-Slipstream) 5h 27' 01" (2) Edvald Boasson Hagen  (Team Columbia-HTC) s.t. (3) Francesco Gavazzi  s.t.
General classification: (1) Farrar 17h 51' 13" (2) Tom Boonen  + 20" (3) Hagen + 23"

Field hockey
Men's EuroHockey Nations Championship in Amstelveen, Netherlands:
Pool B:
 9–0 
 3–0 
Women's EuroHockey Nations Championship in Amstelveen, Netherlands:
Pool A:
 10–0 
 4–0 
Pool B:
 3–1 
 7–0 

Football (soccer)
Women's Professional Soccer Final in Carson, California
Los Angeles Sol 0–1 Sky Blue FCNehru Cup in New Delhi:
 4–3 

Golf
LPGA Tour:
Solheim Cup in Sugar Grove, Illinois, day 2:
Round 3 (Four-ball):
Christina Kim/Michelle Wie  defeat Helen Alfredsson/Tania Elósegui  5 & 4
Catriona Matthew/Diana Luna  and Angela Stanford/Brittany Lang  halved
Matthew and Luna salvage a tie after trailing by 2 with 2 holes to play.
Suzann Pettersen/Anna Nordqvist  defeat Nicole Castrale/Cristie Kerr  2 up
Gwladys Nocera/Maria Hjorth  defeat Brittany Lincicome/Kristy McPherson  1 up
Standings after Round 3: Team USA  6–6  Team Europe
Round 4 (Foursome):
Janice Moodie/Sophie Gustafson  defeat Paula Creamer/Juli Inkster  4 & 3
Kristy McPherson/Morgan Pressel  defeat Helen Alfredsson/Suzann Pettersen  2 up
Becky Brewerton/Gwladys Nocera  defeat Natalie Gulbis/Christina Kim  5 & 4
Cristie Kerr/Michelle Wie  defeat Anna Nordqvist/Maria Hjorth  1 up
Standings after Round 4: Team USA  8–8  Team Europe
Senior majors:
JELD-WEN Tradition in Sunriver, Oregon, third round:
Leaderboard: (1) Brad Bryant  201 (−15) (2) Mike Reid  203 (−13) (3) John Cook  204 (−12)

Rugby union
Tri Nations Series:
 18–19  in Sydney
Standings: South Africa 12 points (3 matches), New Zealand 8 (4), Australia 2 (3).

Volleyball
FIVB World Grand Prix Final Round in Tokyo, Japan:
 1–3 
 3–1 
 0–3 
Standings after 4 matches: Brazil 8 points, Russia 7, Netherlands 6, China, Germany, Japan 5.

August 21, 2009 (Friday)

Athletics
World Championships in Berlin, Germany:
Men's 50 kilometres walk:  Sergey Kirdyapkin  3:38:35  Trond Nymark  3:41:16  Jesus Angel Garcia  3:41:37
Men's high jump:  Yaroslav Rybakov  2.32  Kyriakos Ioannou  2.32  Sylwester Bednarek  & Raul Spank  2.32
Women's discus throw:  Dani Samuels  65.44  Yarelis Barrios  65.31  Nicoleta Grasu  65.20
Women's 200 metres:  Allyson Felix  22.02  Veronica Campbell-Brown  22.35  Debbie Ferguson-McKenzie  22.41
Men's 400 metres:  LaShawn Merritt  44.06  Jeremy Wariner  44.60  Renny Quow  45.02

Auto racing
Nationwide Series:
Food City 250 in Bristol, Tennessee
 (1) David Ragan  (Ford, Roush Fenway Racing) (2) Carl Edwards  (Ford, Roush Fenway Racing) (3) Brad Keselowski  (Chevrolet, JR Motorsports)

Cricket
Australia in England:
The Ashes Series:
5th Test at The Oval, London, day 2:
 332 & 58/3 (28 overs);  160 (52.5 overs; Stuart Broad 5/37). England lead by 230 runs with 7 wickets left in the 2nd innings.
New Zealand in Sri Lanka:
1st Test in Colombo, day 4:
 452 & 259/4d (Tillakaratne Dilshan 123*);  299 & 30/1 (13.0 ov). New Zealand require another 383 runs with 9 wickets remaining.
Kenya in Canada:
2nd ODI in King City, Ontario:Match abandoned without a ball bowled, and will be rescheduled for August 22.Cycling
UCI ProTour:
Tour of Benelux:
Stage 3: (1) Tom Boonen  3h 43' 19" (2) Tyler Farrar  (Garmin-Slipstream) s.t. (3) Francesco Chicchi  s.t.
General classification: (1) Farrar 12h 24' 22" (2) Boonen + 10" (3) Edvald Boasson Hagen  (Team Columbia-HTC) + 19"

Football (soccer)
Nehru Cup in New Delhi:
 –  postponed to August 22 due to heavy rain.

Golf
LPGA Tour:
Solheim Cup in Sugar Grove, Illinois, day 1:
Round 1 (Four-ball):
Paula Creamer/Cristie Kerr  defeat Suzann Pettersen/Sophie Gustafson  1 up
Helen Alfredsson/Tania Elósegui  defeat Angela Stanford/Juli Inkster  1 up
Brittany Lang/Brittany Lincicome  defeat Laura Davies/Becky Brewerton  5 & 4
Catriona Matthew/Maria Hjorth  and Morgan Pressel/Michelle Wie  halved
Standings after Round 1: Team USA  2½–1½  Team Europe
Round 2 (Foursome):
Christina Kim/Natalie Gulbis  defeat Suzann Pettersen/Sophie Gustafson  3 & 2
Becky Brewerton/Gwladys Nocera  defeat Angela Stanford/Nicole Castrale  3 & 1
Maria Hjorth/Anna Nordqvist  defeat Kristy McPherson/Brittany Lincicome  3 & 2
Paula Creamer/Juli Inkster  defeat Catriona Matthew/Janice Moodie  2 & 1
Standings after Round 2: Team USA  4½–3½  Team Europe
Senior majors::
JELD-WEN Tradition in Sunriver, Oregon, second round:
Leaderboard: (1) Brad Bryant  134 (−10) (2) Fred Funk  135 (−9) (3) John Cook, Larry Mize & Loren Roberts (all United States) 136 (−8)

Volleyball
FIVB World Grand Prix Final Round in Tokyo, Japan:
 1–3 
 3–0 
 3–0 
Standings after 3 matches: Brazil 6 points, Russia, Netherlands 5, Japan, Germany 4, China 3.

August 20, 2009 (Thursday)

Athletics
World Championships in Berlin, Germany:
Women's high jump:  Blanka Vlašić  2.04  Anna Chicherova  2.02  Ariane Friedrich  2.02
Women's 400 metres hurdles:  Melaine Walker  52.42 CR  Lashinda Demus  52.96  Josanne Lucas  53.20 NR
Walker's time is the second fastest in history, just 0.08 off the world record.
Men's 200 metres:  Usain Bolt  19.19 WR  Alonso Edward  19.81 AR  Wallace Spearmon  19.85
Bolt gets his second world record, both by 0.11 seconds.
Men's 110 metres hurdles:  Ryan Brathwaite  13.14 NR  Terrence Trammell  13.15  David Payne  13.15
Men's decathlon:  Trey Hardee  8790 points  Leonel Suárez  8640  Aleksandr Pogorelov  8528

Basketball
EuroBasket qualification additional qualifying round:
Group A:  58–60 
Standings: Belgium, Bosnia & Herzegovina 7 points, Portugal 4.
Group B:  89–95 
Standings: France 7 points, Finland 6, Italy 5.
Belgium and France advance to the final series.

Cricket
Australia in England:
The Ashes Series:
5th Test at The Oval, London, day 1:
 307/8 (85.3 ov)
New Zealand in Sri Lanka:
1st Test in Colombo, day 3:
 452;  281/8 (105.0 ov). New Zealand trail by 171 runs with 2 wickets remaining in the 1st innings.
ICC Intercontinental Cup:
 v  in Aberdeen, day 4:
No play due to rain.  202 and 303;  208 and 72/5. Match drawn.Standings: Scotland 29 points (2 matches), Kenya 23 (2), Ireland 12 (2), Afghanistan, Netherlands 9 (1), Zimbabwe XI 3 (1), Canada 3 (3).

Cycling
UCI ProTour:
Tour of Benelux:
Stage 2: (1) Tyler Farrar  (Garmin-Slipstream) 4hr 17' 53" (2) Yauheni Hutarovich  s.t. (3) Edvald Boasson Hagen  (Team Columbia-HTC) s.t.
General classification: (1) Farrar 8hr 41' 09" (2) Hagen + 13" (3) Tom Boonen  + 14"

Football (soccer)
CONCACAF Champions League Group Stage, round 1:
Group B:
San Juan Jabloteh  0–1  Toluca
Group D:
Real España  1–0  W Connection
Copa Sudamericana First Stage, first leg:
Boca Juniors  1–1  Vélez Sársfield
Copa Sudamericana First Stage, second leg: (first leg score in parentheses)Cienciano  2–0 (0–0)  Liverpool. Cienciano win 2–0 on aggregate.
La Paz  1–2 (0–2)  Cerro Porteño. Cerro Porteño win 4–1 on aggregate.
Nehru Cup in New Delhi:
 2–0 

Golf
Senior majors::
JELD-WEN Tradition in Sunriver, Oregon, first round:
Leaderboard: (1) Brad Bryant  62 (−10) (2) Loren Roberts  65 (−5) (3) Tom Lehman & Tom Watson (both United States) 67 (−3)

Volleyball
FIVB World Grand Prix Final Round in Tokyo, Japan:
 3–2 
 0–3 
 1–3 
Standings after 2 matches: Brazil, Netherlands 4 points, Russia, Germany 3, China, Japan 2.

August 19, 2009 (Wednesday)

Athletics
World Championships in Berlin, Germany:
Men's discus throw:  Robert Harting  69.43  Piotr Małachowski  69.15 NR  Gerd Kanter  66.88
Harting wins the title with his final throw.
Men's 1500 metres:  Yusuf Saad Kamel  3:35.93  Deresse Mekonnen  3:36.01  Bernard Lagat  3:36.20
Kamel's father Billy Konchellah is a two-times world champion.
Women's 100 metres hurdles:  Brigitte Foster-Hylton  12.51  Priscilla Lopes-Schliep  12.54  Delloreen Ennis-London  12.55
Women's 800 metres:  Caster Semenya  1:55.45  Janeth Jepkosgei  1:57.90 Jennifer Meadows  1:57.93
Men's decathlon (standings after 5 events): (1) Oleksiy Kasyanov  4555 points (2) Yunior Díaz  4512 (3) Trey Hardee  4511

Cricket
New Zealand in Sri Lanka:
1st Test in Colombo, day 2:
 452 (Mahela Jayawardene 114, Thilan Samaraweera 159);  87/2 (29.0 ov). New Zealand trail by 365 runs with 8 wickets remaining in the 1st innings.
Kenya in Canada:
1st ODI in King City, Ontario:
 113 (33.1 ov);  117/1 (16.2 ov). Canada win by 9 wickets, lead 3-match series 1–0.
ICC Intercontinental Cup:
 XI v  in Mutare, day 4:
 XI 350 & 446/9d (113.5 ov, Trevor Garwe 117);  427 & 211/4 (44.5 ov, Noor Ali 100*). Match drawn.
 v  in Aberdeen, day 3:
 202 & 303 (William Porterfield 118);  208 & 72/5 (31.0 ov). Scotland require another 226 runs with 5 wickets remaining.

Cycling
UCI ProTour:
Tour of Benelux:
Stage 1: (1) Tyler Farrar  (Garmin-Slipstream) 4h 18' 30" (2) Tom Boonen  s.t. (3) Edvald Boasson Hagen  (Team Columbia-HTC) s.t
General classification: (1) Farrar 4h 23' 26" (2) Boonen + 4" (3) Sylvain Chavanel  (Quick Step) + 9"

Football (soccer)
UEFA Champions League Play-off round, first leg:
Champions Path:
Red Bull Salzburg  1–2  Maccabi Haifa
Ventspils  0–3  Zürich
Levski Sofia  1–2  Debrecen
Non-Champions Path:
Lyon  5–1  Anderlecht
Panathinaikos  2–3  Atlético Madrid
CONCACAF Champions League Group Stage, round 1:
Group A:
Houston Dynamo  1–0  Isidro Metapán
Árabe Unido  4–1  Pachuca
Group C:
Cruz Azul  2–0  Saprissa
Copa Sudamericana First Stage, first leg:
River Plate  1–2  Lanús
Women's Professional Soccer Playoffs Super Semifinal in Fenton, Missouri:
Saint Louis Athletica 0–1 Sky Blue FCNehru Cup in New Delhi:
 0–1 

Volleyball
FIVB World Grand Prix Final Round in Tokyo, Japan:
 3–2 
 3–2 
 1–3 

August 18, 2009 (Tuesday)

American football
After saying last month that he would probably retire, quarterback Brett Favre signs a two-year deal with the Minnesota Vikings for US$25 million. (ESPN)

Athletics
World Championships in Berlin, Germany:
Men's triple jump:  Phillips Idowu  17.73  Nelson Évora  17.55  Alexis Copello  17.36
Women's javelin throw:  Steffi Nerius  67.30  Barbora Špotáková  66.42  Maria Abakumova  66.06
Thirty-seven-year-old Nerius becomes the oldest world champion in history.
Women's 400 metres:  Sanya Richards  49.00  Shericka Williams  49.32  Antonina Krivoshapka  49.71
Men's 3000 metres steeplechase:  Ezekiel Kemboi  8:00.43 CR  Richard Kipkemboi Mateelong  8:00.89  Bouabdellah Tahri  8:01.18 ER
Men's 400 metres hurdles:  Kerron Clement  47.91  Javier Culson  48.09  Bershawn Jackson  48.23

Cricket
New Zealand in Sri Lanka:
1st Test in Colombo, day 1:
 293/3 (78.0 ov, Mahela Jayawardene 108*)
Bangladesh in Zimbabwe:
5th ODI in Bulawayo:
 209 (46.4 ov);  212/5 (47.5 ov). Bangladesh win by 5 wickets, and win the 5-match series 4–1.
ICC Intercontinental Cup:
 XI v  in Mutare, day 3:
 XI 350 & 267/6 (74.2 ov, Tatenda Taibu 120);  427 (Mohammad Nabi 102). Zimbabwe XI lead by 190 runs with 4 wickets remaining.
 v  in Aberdeen, day 2:
 202 & 102/3 (40.0 ov);  208 (Qasim Sheikh 100*). Ireland lead by 96 runs with 7 wickets remaining.

Cycling
UCI ProTour:
Tour of Benelux:
Prologue: (1) Sylvain Chavanel  4' 55" (2) Tyler Farrar  (Garmin-Slipstream) + 1" (3) Tom Boonen  (Quick Step) + 1"

Football (soccer)
UEFA Champions League Play-off round, first leg:
Champions Path:
Sheriff Tiraspol  0–2  Olympiacos
Copenhagen  1–0  APOEL
Non-Champions Path:
Celtic  0–2  Arsenal
Timişoara  0–2  Stuttgart
Sporting CP 2–2   Fiorentina
CONCACAF Champions League Group Stage, round 1:
Group B:
Marathón  3–1  D.C. United
Group C:
Columbus Crew  2–0  Puerto Rico Islanders
Group D:
UNAM  1–0  Comunicaciones
Copa Sudamericana First Stage, first leg:
Tigre  2–1  San Lorenzo
Copa Sudamericana First Stage, second leg: (first leg score in parentheses)
Deportivo Cali  0–1 (1–2)  Universidad de Chile. Universidad de Chile win 3–1 on aggregate.

August 17, 2009 (Monday)

Athletics
World Championships in Berlin, Germany:
Men's hammer throw:  Primož Kozmus  80.84  Szymon Ziółkowski  79.30  Aleksey Zagornyi  78.09
Women's pole vault:  Anna Rogowska  4.75  Chelsea Johnson  & Monika Pyrek  4.65
Four-time world champion Yelena Isinbayeva fails to clear any height.
Women's triple jump:  Yargelis Savigne  14.95  Mabel Gay  14.61  Anna Pyatykh  14.58
Women's 3000 metres steeplechase:  Marta Domínguez  9:07.32  Yuliya Zarudneva  9:08.39  Milcah Chemos Cheywa  9:08.57
Men's 10,000 metres:  Kenenisa Bekele  26:46.31 CR  Zersenay Tadese  26:50.12  Moses Ndiema Masai  26:57.39
Bekele wins his fourth straight title at this event.
Women's 100 metres:
Semifinals, heat 1: (1) Shelly-Ann Fraser  10.79
Semifinals, heat 2: (1) Carmelita Jeter  10.83
Final:  Fraser 10.73  Kerron Stewart  10.75  Jeter 10.90
Fraser becomes the joint-third fastest woman in history and clocks the fastest time in more than 10 years.

Basketball
EuroBasket qualification additional qualifying round: (teams in bold advance to the final series)
Group A:  102–79 
Standings: Bosnia & Herzegovina 7 points (4 games), Belgium 5 (3),  3 (3).
Belgium will advance to the final series if they beat Portugal; otherwise Bosnia & Herzegovina advance.
Group B:  77–73 Standings: France 7 points (4 games), Italy, Finland 4 (3).

Cricket
ICC Intercontinental Cup:
 v  in King City, Ontario, day 4:
 317 & 362/3d;  234 & 198 (65.3 ov). Kenya win by 247 runs.
Kenya goes to the top of the standings with 23 points from 2 matches, ahead of Scotland with 20 points from one match.
 XI v  in Mutare, day 2:
 XI 350 (Tatenda Taibu 172);  358/7 (110.0 ov, Noor Ali 130). Afghanistan lead by 8 runs with 3 wickets remaining in the 1st innings.
 v  in Aberdeen, day 1:
 202;  76/2 (27.0 ov). Scotland trail by 126 runs with 8 wickets remaining in the 1st innings.

August 16, 2009 (Sunday)

Athletics
World Championships in Berlin, Germany:
Women's 20 kilometres walk:  Olga Kaniskina  1:28:09  Olive Loughnane  1:28:58  Liu Hong  1:29:10
Women's shot put:  Valerie Vili  20.44  Nadine Kleinert  20.20  Gong Lijiao  19.89
Women's heptathlon:  Jessica Ennis  6731 points  Jennifer Oeser  6493  Kamila Chudzik  6471
Men's 100 metres:
Semifinals, heat 1: (1) Usain Bolt  9.89
Semifinals, heat 2: (1) Tyson Gay  9.93
Final:  Bolt 9.58 WR  Gay 9.71 NR  Asafa Powell  9.84
Bolt improves his own record by 0.11 second, the biggest improvement of the world record in 100 metres dash since the introduction of electronic measurement.

Auto racing
Sprint Cup Series:
CARFAX 400 in Brooklyn, Michigan:
 (1) Brian Vickers  (Toyota, Red Bull Racing Team) (2) Jeff Gordon  (Chevrolet, Hendrick Motorsports) (3) Dale Earnhardt Jr.  (Chevrolet, Hendrick Motorsports)
Drivers' standings (after 23 of 26 races leading to the Chase for the Sprint Cup): (1) Tony Stewart  3500 points (Chevrolet, Stewart Haas Racing) (2) Gordon 3216 (3) Jimmie Johnson  3197 (Chevrolet, Hendrick Motorsports)
Stewart becomes the first driver to secure his spot in the 2009 Chase.

Badminton
BWF World Championships in Hyderabad, India: (seeding in parentheses)
Men's singles: Lin Dan  (5) bt Chen Jin  (2) 21–18, 21–16
Women's singles: Lu Lan  (7) bt Xie Xingfang  (5) 23–21, 21–12
Men's doubles: Cai Yun/Fu Haifeng  (5) bt Jung Jae-sung/Lee Yong-dae  (4) 21–18, 16–21, 28–26
Women's doubles: Zhang Yawen/Zhao Tingting  (8) bt Cheng Shu/Zhao Yunlei  (2) 17–21, 21–17, 21–16
Mixed doubles: Thomas Laybourn/Kamilla Rytter Juhl  (7) bt Nova Widianto/Liliyana Natsir  (2) 21–13, 21–17

Basketball
Asian Championship in Tianjin, China:
Final:   70–52  
Iran win the title for the second straight time.
3rd Place:   80–66 
Jordan qualify for 2010 World Championship.

Cricket
Bangladesh in Zimbabwe:
4th ODI in Bulawayo:
 312/8 (50 ov, Charles Coventry 194 *);  313/6 (47.5 ov, Tamim Iqbal 154). Bangladesh win by 4 wickets, take unassailable 3–1 lead in the 5-match series.ICC Intercontinental Cup:
 v  in King City, Ontario, day 3:
 317 & 362/3d (Seren Waters 157*, Steve Tikolo 169);  234 & 61/2 (15.0 ov). Canada require another 385 runs with 8 wickets remaining.
 XI v  in Mutare, day 1:

Cycling
UCI ProTour:
Vattenfall Cyclassics:
(1) Tyler Farrar  (Garmin-Slipstream) 5h 30' 38" (2) Matti Breschel  (Saxo Bank) (3) Gerald Ciolek 

Field hockey
Women's Junior World Cup in Boston, USA:
Third place:   2–1 
Final:   3–0  

Football (soccer)
CAF Champions League group stage, round 3:
Group B:
Heartland  3–0  Etoile du Sahel
Standings: TP Mazembe, Heartland 6 points, Etoile du Sahel, Monomotapa United 3.
Spanish Super Cup, first leg:
Athletic Bilbao 1–2 Barcelona

Golf
Men's majors:
PGA Championship in Chaska, Minnesota, final round:
(1) Y.E. Yang  280 (−8) (2) Tiger Woods  283 (−5) (3) Lee Westwood  & Rory McIlroy  285 (−3)
Yang becomes the first Asian-born winner of a men's major championship, and also ends Woods' previous record of winning every major in which he led after the third round.

Motorcycle racing
Moto GP:
Czech Republic Grand Prix in Brno, Czech Republic:
(1) Valentino Rossi  (Yamaha) 43:08.991 (2) Dani Pedrosa  (Honda) +11.766 (3) Toni Elias  (Honda) +20.756
Riders' standings (after 11 of 17 races): (1) Rossi 212 points (2) Jorge Lorenzo  (Yamaha) 162 (3) Casey Stoner  (Ducati) 150
Manufacturers' standings: (1) Yamaha 230 points (2) Honda 164 (3) Ducati 156

Shooting
World Shotgun Championships in Maribor, Slovenia:
Men's skeet:  Vincent Hancock  149 (124)  Georgios Achilleos  148 (123)  Ennio Falco  147 (122)

Tennis
ATP World Tour:
Rogers Cup in Montreal, Canada:
Final: Andy Murray  def. Juan Martín del Potro  6–7(4), 7–6(3), 6–1
Murray wins his 5th title of the year and 13th of his career. He advances to #2 in the ATP ranking.
WTA Tour:
Western & Southern Financial Group Women's Open in Mason, Ohio, United States:
Final: Jelena Janković  def. Dinara Safina  6–4, 6–2
Janković wins her second title of the year and 11th overall.

Volleyball
FIVB World Grand Prix:
3rd Preliminary round: (teams in bold advance to the final round)
Pool G in Hong Kong:
 2–3  3–1 Pool H in Mokpo, South Korea: 2–3  1–3 Pool I in Bangkok, Thailand:
 2–3 
 0–3 Final standings: Brazil 18 points, Netherlands 17, China 16, Russia 15, Japan, Germany 14, Poland, Thailand 13, USA 12, Puerto Rico, Dominican Republic, Korea 10.

August 15, 2009 (Saturday)

Athletics
World Championships in Berlin, Germany:
Men's 20 kilometres walk:  Valeriy Borchin  1:18:41  Wang Hao  1:19:06  Eder Sanchez  1:19:22
Women's 10,000 metres:  Linet Masai  30:51.24  Meselech Melkamu  30:51.34  Wude Ayalew  30:51.95
Men's shot put:  Christian Cantwell  22.03  Tomasz Majewski  21.91  Ralf Bartels  21.37
Women's heptathlon (standings after 4 events): (1) Jessica Ennis  4124 points (2) Nataliya Dobrynska  3817 (3) Jennifer Oeser  3814

Auto racing
Nationwide Series:
CARFAX 250 in Brooklyn, Michigan:
 (1) Brad Keselowski  (Chevrolet, JR Motorsports) (2) Brian Vickers  (Toyota, Braun Racing) (3) Kyle Busch  (Toyota, Joe Gibbs Racing)

Basketball
African Championship in Tripoli, Libya:
Final:   82–72  
Angola win the title for the sixth successive time and 10th of the last 11 tournaments.
3rd Place:   83–68 
Tunisia qualify for the 2010 World Championship.
Asian Championship in Tianjin, China:
Semi-finals:
 75–77 
 68–72 
Iran and China qualify for the 2010 World Championship.

Cricket
ICC Intercontinental Cup in King City, Ontario, day 2:
 317 & 12/0 (7.0 ov);  234. Kenya lead by 95 runs with 10 wickets remaining.
Twenty20 Cup Final in Birmingham:
Sussex Sharks 172/7 (20/20 ov); Somerset Sabres 109 (17.2/20 ov). Sussex win by 63 runs.

Fistball
European Women's Championship in Zofingen, Switzerland:
3rd place:   3–0 
Final:   3–1  

Football (soccer)
CAF Champions League group stage, round 3:
Group A:
Al-Merreikh  2–3  ZESCO United
Standings: Al-Hilal 7 points, ZESCO United, Kano Pillars 4, Al-Merreikh 1.
Group B:
TP Mazembe  5–0  Monomotapa United
Standings: TP Mazembe 6 points (3 matches), Étoile du Sahel, Heartland 3 (2), Monomotapa United 3 (3).
Women's Professional Soccer Playoffs First round in Germantown, Maryland:
Washington Freedom 1–2 Sky Blue FCGolf
Men's majors:
PGA Championship in Chaska, Minnesota, third round:
 Leaderboard: (1) Tiger Woods  208 (−8) (2) Y.E. Yang  & Pádraig Harrington  210 (−6)

Volleyball
FIVB World Grand Prix:
3rd Preliminary round: (teams in bold advance to the final round)
Pool G in Hong Kong:
 0–3  2–3 
Pool H in Mokpo, South Korea: 3–2  0–3 Pool I in Bangkok, Thailand: 3–1 
 0–3 
Standings after 8 matches: Brazil, Netherlands 16 points, China 14, Russia, Germany 13,  Japan 12, Poland, USA, Thailand 11, Puerto Rico, Dominican Republic, Korea 9.

August 14, 2009 (Friday)

American football
 The Philadelphia Eagles sign former Atlanta Falcons quarterback Michael Vick, recently released from federal prison after serving over two years for his dog fighting activities. The deal is for one year at US$1.6 million, with a team option for a second year at $5.2 million. (ESPN)

Basketball
African Championship in Tripoli, Libya:
Semifinals:
 79–69 
 61–68 
Angola and Côte d'Ivoire qualify for 2010 World Championship.
Asian Championship in Tianjin, China:
Quarter-finals:
 81–70 
 65–75 
 83–101 
 65–68 
EuroBasket qualification additional qualifying round:
Group A:  73–61 
Standings: Bosnia & Herzegovina 6 points (3 games),  3 (2), Portugal 3 (3).
Group B:  81–61 
Standings: France 6 points (3 games), Italy 4 (3),  2 (2).
France advance to the final series.

Cricket
Bangladesh in Zimbabwe:
3rd ODI in Bulawayo:
 323/7 (50 ov, Hamilton Masakadza 102);  254 (44.2 ov). Zimbabwe win by 69 runs. Bangladesh lead the 5-match series 2–1.
ICC Intercontinental Cup:
 v  in King City, Ontario, day 1:
 317 (86.1 ov, Steve Tikolo 158);  14/2 (6.0 ov). Canada trail by 303 runs with 8 wickets remaining in the 1st innings.

Fistball
European Women's Championship in Zofingen, Switzerland:
First round:
 2–0 
 2–0 
 2–0 
 2–0 
 1–2 
 2–0 
 2–0 
 2–0 
 2–0 
 2–0 
Standings: Austria 4–0, Switzerland 3–1, Germany 2–2, Italy 1–3, Catalonia 0–4.

Football (soccer)
CAF Champions League group stage, round 3:
Group A:
Al-Hilal  2–0  Kano Pillars
Standings: Al-Hilal 7 points (3 matches), Kano Pillars 4 (3), ZESCO United, Al-Merreikh 1 (2).

Golf
Men's majors:
PGA Championship in Chaska, Minnesota, second round:
Leaderboard: (1) Tiger Woods  137 (−7) (2) Ross Fisher , Lucas Glover , Pádraig Harrington , Brendan Jones , & Vijay Singh  141 (−3)

Volleyball
FIVB World Grand Prix:
3rd Preliminary round: (teams in bold advance to the final round)
Pool G in Hong Kong:
 0–3  3–1 
Pool H in Mokpo, South Korea:
 1–3 
 1–3 Pool I in Bangkok, Thailand:
 0–3 
 1–3 
Standings after 7 matches: Brazil, Netherlands 14 points, China 13, Germany 12, Russia 11, Japan, Thailand 10, Poland, USA 9, Puerto Rico, Dominican Republic, Korea 8.

August 13, 2009 (Thursday)

Basketball
African Championship in Tripoli, Libya:
Quarterfinals:
 84–63 
 73–74 
 80–84 
 84–78 

Football (soccer)
Copa Sudamericana First Stage, first leg:
Vitória  2–0  Coritiba
Liverpool  0–0  Cienciano

Golf
Men's majors:
PGA Championship in Chaska, Minnesota, first round:
Leaderboard: (1) Tiger Woods  67 (−5) (2) Pádraig Harrington  68 (−4) (3) Six players at 69 (−3)

Olympics
At a meeting in Berlin, the executive board of the International Olympic Committee recommends golf and rugby sevens for inclusion in the 2016 Summer Olympics program. The choices must still be ratified by the full IOC at its October meeting in Copenhagen. The board also decide to include women's boxing at the 2012 Summer Olympics in London. (ESPN)

Shooting
World Shotgun Championships in Maribor, Slovenia:
Men's double trap:  Francesco D'Aniello  190 (146)  Jeffrey Holguín  186+2 (144)  Wang Nan  186+0 (144)

August 12, 2009 (Wednesday)

Basketball
Asian Championship in Tianjin, China: (teams in bold advance to the quarterfinals)
Group E: 85–71 
 79–99  66–82 Standings: Iran 10 points, Korea 9, Philippines 8, Chinese Taipei 7, Japan 6, Kuwait 5.
Group F: 91–45 
 56–105  89–83 Standings: China 10 points, Jordan 9, Lebanon 8, Qatar 7, Kazakhstan 6, UAE 5.

Cricket
Pakistan in Sri Lanka:
Only T20I in Colombo:
 172/5 (20.0/20 ov);  120 (18.1/20 ov). Pakistan win by 52 runs.

Football (soccer)
2010 FIFA World Cup Qualifying:
2010 FIFA World Cup qualification (UEFA):
Group 3:
 5–0 
Standings: Slovakia 15 points (6 matches), Northern Ireland 13 (7), Slovenia 11 (7).
Group 4:
 0–2 
Standings: Germany 19 points (7 matches), Russia 15 (6), Finland 10 (6).
Group 6:
 1–3 
Standings: England 21 points (7 matches), Croatia 14 (7), Ukraine 11 (6).
Group 7:
 0–1 
Standings: Serbia 18 points (7 matches), France 13 (6), Lithuania 9 (7).
Group 9:
 4–0 
Standings: Netherlands 21 points (7 matches), Macedonia, Scotland 7 (6), Norway 6 (4).
2010 FIFA World Cup qualification (CONCACAF), matchday 6: (All times UTC)
 2–1 
 1–0 
 4–0 
Standings: Costa Rica 12 points, Honduras, USA 10, Mexico 9, El Salvador, Trinidad & Tobago 5.
Friendly internationals:
 6–1 
 1–0 
 2–0 
 1–4 
 0–2 
 2–3 
 1–0 
 3–1 
 1–2 
 3–3 
 0–1 
 4–1 
 0–1 
 1–1 
 0–3 
 0–3 
 0–1 
 2–3 
 3–0 
 2–0 
 2–1 
 1–1 
 1–0 
 2–2 
 1–1 
 2–1 
 2–0 
 2–3 
 1–2 
 2–1 
 1–1 
 1–3 
 1–0 
 1–0 
 0–0 
 0–0 
 0–3 
Copa Sudamericana First Stage, first leg:
Fluminense  0–0  Flamengo
Cerro Porteño  2–0  La Paz

August 11, 2009 (Tuesday)

Auto racing
 Seven-time Formula One champion Michael Schumacher calls off his comeback to F1 racing as a substitute driver for the injured Felipe Massa, citing lingering effects of injuries suffered in a motorcycle crash in February. Massa's Ferrari ride will instead be taken over by Luca Badoer. (AP via ESPN)

Basketball
African Championship in Libya: (teams in bold advance to the quarterfinals)
Group E in Benghazi:
 64–80  95–73  93–85 Standings: Angola 12 points, Nigeria 11, Mali 10, Côte d'Ivoire 9, Libya 8, Egypt 7.
Group F in Tripoli:
 73–81  82–69  65–73 Standings: Senegal, Tunisia 10 points, Cameroon, Central African Republic, Morocco, Rwanda 9.
Asian Championship in Tianjin, China: (teams in bold advance to the quarterfinals)
Group E: 88–78  51–78 
 70–72 Standings: Iran, Korea 8 points, Philippines 6, Chinese Taipei, Japan 5, Kuwait 4.
Group F:
 56–84 
 68–71  74–60 
Standings: China, Jordan 8 points, Lebanon 6, Qatar, Kazakhstan 5, UAE 4.
EuroBasket qualification additional qualifying round:
Group A:  64–58 
Standings:  4 points, Belgium 3, Portugal 2.
Group B:  75–77 
Standings:  4 points, Italy 3, Finland 2.

Cricket
Bangladesh in Zimbabwe:
2nd ODI in Bulawayo:
 320/8 (50 ov, Shakib Al Hasan 104);  271 (46.1 ov). Bangladesh win by 49 runs, lead the 5-match series 2–0.

Football (soccer)
Copa Sudamericana First Stage, first leg:
LDU Quito  1–0  Libertad
Blooming  0–1  River Plate
Match abandoned after 66 minutes due to incident involving a spectator and a River Plate player. River Plate is awarded a 3–0 win.

Shooting
World Shotgun Championships in Maribor, Slovenia:
Women's skeet:  Christine Brinker  95 (72)  Sutiya Jiewchaloemmit  94 (73)  Katiuscia Spada  93 (72)
Women's trap:  Jessica Rossi  92 (71)  Irina Laricheva  90 (73)  Satu Mäkelä-Nummela  89 (74 EWR)

August 10, 2009 (Monday)

Auto racing
Sprint Cup Series:
Heluva Good! Sour Cream Dips at The Glen in Watkins Glen, New York
 (1) Tony Stewart  (Chevrolet, Stewart Haas Racing) (2) Marcos Ambrose  (Toyota, JTG Daugherty Racing) (3) Carl Edwards  (Ford, Roush Fenway Racing)
Drivers' standings (after 22 of 26 races leading to the Chase for the Sprint Cup): (1) Stewart 3383 points (2) Jimmie Johnson  3123 (Chevrolet, Hendrick Motorsports) (3) Jeff Gordon  3041 (Chevrolet, Hendrick Motorsports)
 Stewart needs only to start next weekend's race at Michigan to become the first driver to secure a spot in the Chase.

Basketball
African Championship in Libya: (teams in bold advance to the quarterfinals)
Group E in Benghazi:
 61–88  75–73  74–70 
Standings: Angola, Nigeria 10 points, Mali 8, Côte d'Ivoire, Libya 7, Egypt 6.
Group F in Tripoli:
 85–64 
 73–75 
 66–68 Standings: Tunisia 9 points, Cameroon, Senegal, Morocco 8, Central African Republic, Rwanda 7.
Asian Championship in Tianjin, China:
Group E:
 78–58 
 71–101 
 77–70 
Standings: Iran, Korea 6 points, Philippines 5, Chinese Taipei 4, Japan, Quwait 3.
Group F:
 80–98 
 82–59 
 63–73 
Standings: China, Jordan 6 points, Lebanon 5, Qatar 4, Kazakhstan, UAE 3.

August 9, 2009 (Sunday)

Auto racing
Sprint Cup Series:
Heluva Good! Sour Cream Dips at The Glen in Watkins Glen, New York
 Postponed to Monday due to rain.
IndyCar Series:
Honda 200 in Lexington, Ohio
(1) Scott Dixon  (Chip Ganassi Racing) (2) Ryan Briscoe  (Penske Racing)  (3) Dario Franchitti  (Chip Ganassi Racing)
Drivers' standings (after 13 of 17 races): (1) Dixon 460 points (2) Briscoe 457 (3) Franchitti 440

Basketball
African Championship in Libya:
Group E in Benghazi:
 71–58 
 91–58 
 77–87 
Standings: Angola, Nigeria 8 points, Mali 7, Côte d'Ivoire 6, Egypt, Libya 5.
Group F in Tripoli:
 54–80 
 72–59 
 76–75 
Standings: Senegal, Cameroon, Tunisia 7 points, Morocco, Rwanda 6, Central African Republic 5.

Cricket
Australia in England:
The Ashes Series:
4th Test in Leeds, day 3:
 102 & 263 (61.3 ov, Mitchell Johnson 5/69);  445. Australia win by an innings and 80 runs.  5-match series level 1–1.Pakistan in Sri Lanka:
5th ODI in Colombo:
 279/8 (50 ov);  147 (34.2 ov). Pakistan win by 132 runs. Sri Lanka win the 5-match series 3–2.Bangladesh in Zimbabwe:
1st ODI in Bulawayo:
 207 (47.5 ov);  211/2 (34.3 ov, Mohammad Ashraful 103*). Bangladesh win by 8 wickets, lead 5-match series 1–0.Football (soccer)
Community Shield at Wembley Stadium, London:
Manchester United 2–2 Chelsea. Chelsea win 4–1 in penalty shootout.

Golf
World Golf Championships:
Bridgestone Invitational in Akron, Ohio
 Winner: Tiger Woods  268 (−12)
 Woods wins for the second straight week, helped greatly by a four-shot swing on the 16th hole where he birdied and Pádraig Harrington  triple-bogeyed.
PGA Tour:
Legends Reno-Tahoe Open in Reno, Nevada
 Winner: John Rollins  271 (−17)

Shooting
World Shotgun Championships in Maribor, Slovenia: (Qualification scores in parentheses)
Men's trap:  Marian Kovacocy  146 (122)  Massimo Fabbrizi  145+1 (123)  Oguzhan Tuzun  145+0 (123)

Tennis
ATP World Tour:
Legg Mason Tennis Classic in Washington, D.C., United States
Final: Juan Martín del Potro  def. Andy Roddick  3–6, 7–5, 7–6(6)
Del Potro wins this tournament for the second consecutive year for his second title of the year and sixth of his career.
WTA Tour:
LA Women's Tennis Championships in Carson, California, United States
Final: Flavia Pennetta  def. Samantha Stosur  6–4, 6–3
Pennetta wins her second title of the year and eighth of her career.

Volleyball
FIVB World Grand Prix:
2nd Preliminary round: (teams in bold advance to the final round)
Pool D in Miaoli, Chinese Taipei 3–0 
 3–0 
Pool E in Macau
 0–3 
 2–3 Pool F in Osaka, Japan
 3–2 
 3–1 
Standings after 6 matches: Brazil, Netherlands 12 points, China 11, Germany 10, Japan, Russia 9, Poland, USA, Thailand 8, Puerto Rico, Korea, Dominican Republic 7.

August 8, 2009 (Saturday)

Auto racing
Nationwide Series:
Zippo 200 at the Glen in Watkins Glen, New York
(1) Marcos Ambrose  (Toyota, JTG Daugherty Racing) (2) Kyle Busch  (Toyota, Joe Gibbs Racing) (3) Carl Edwards  (Ford, Roush Fenway Racing)

Basketball
Asian Championship in Tianjin, China: (teams in bold advance to the second round)
Group A:
 45–148  56–69 Standings: Korea 6 points, Philippines 5, Japan 4, Sri Lanka 3.
Group B:
 78–102  46–94 Standings: Iran 6 points, Chinese Taipei 5, Kuwait 4, Uzbekistan 3.
Group C: 92–61  72–74 Standings: China 6 points, Qatar 5, Kazakhstan 4, India 3.
Group D: 67–79  36–123 Standings: Jordan 6 points, Lebanon 5, UAE 4, Indonesia 3.
EuroBasket qualification additional qualifying round:
Group A:  82–77 
Standings: Bosnia & Herzegovina 4 points (2 games), Belgium, Portugal 1(1).
Group B:  82–72 
Standings: France 4 points (2 games), Italy, Finland 1(1).

Cricket
Australia in England:
The Ashes Series:
4th Test in Leeds, day 2:
 102 & 82/5 (32.0 ov);  445 (Marcus North 110, Stuart Broad 6/91). England trail by 261 runs with 5 wickets remaining.

Cycling
UCI ProTour:
Tour de Pologne:
Stage 7: (1) André Greipel  (Team Columbia-HTC) 2h 55' 39" (2) Christopher Sutton  (Garmin-Slipstream) s.t. (3) Wouter Weylandt  s.t.
Final general classification: (1) Alessandro Ballan  28h 46' 13" (2) Daniel Moreno  + 10' (3) Edvald Boasson Hagen  (Team Columbia-HTC) + 11"

Football (soccer)
Italian Supercup in Beijing, China:
Internazionale 1–2 LazioRacquetball
European Championships in Paris:
Men's singles:
 Víctor Montserrat   Carlos Oviedo   Eric Gordon   Oliver Bertels 
Women's singles:
 Elisabet Consegal   Yvonne Kortes   Andrea Gordon   Majella Haverty 
Men's doubles:
 Adam Neary / Joe Farrell   Eric Gordon / Oliver Bertels   Joseph Dillon / Sean Kene   Arne Schmitz / Bernd Dröge 
Women's doubles:
 Antonia Neary   Katie Kenny / Majella Haverty   Yvonne Kortes / Andrea Gordon   Daphne Wannee / Kathy Tritsmans  / 

Rugby union
Tri Nations Series:
 29–17  in Cape Town
 Standings: South Africa 12 points (3 matches),  4 (3 matches), Australia 1 (2 matches)

Volleyball
FIVB World Grand Prix:
2nd Preliminary round:
Pool D in Miaoli, Chinese Taipei:
 2–3 
 0–3 
Pool E in Macau:
 3–1 
 3–1 
Pool F in Osaka, Japan:
 1–3 
 3–1 
Standing after 5 matches: Brazil, China, Netherlands 10 points, Germany, Russia 8, Japan, USA, Thailand 7, Poland, Puerto Rico, Dominican Republic 6, South Korea 5.

August 7, 2009 (Friday)

Basketball
African Championship in Libya: (teams in bold advance to the second round)
Group A in Benghazi: 81–97  94–57 
Standings: Nigeria 6 points, Côte d'Ivoire 5, Libya 4, South Africa 3.
Group B in Benghazi: 93–50  47–67 Standings: Angola 6 points, Mali 5, Egypt 4, Mozambique 3.
Group C in Tripoli: 65–67  61–113 Standings: Senegal 6 points, Cameroon 5, Central African Republic 4, Congo 3.
Group D in Tripoli:
 83–86  57–74 Standings: Tunisia, Morocco 5 points, Rwanda, Cape Verde 4.
Asian Championship in Tianjin, China: (teams in bold advance to the second round)
Group A: 122–54 
 69–78 Group B:
 73–51  82–61 
Group C:
 56–74  95–70 
Group D: 105–47 
 108–38 

Cricket
Australia in England:
The Ashes Series:
4th Test in Leeds, day 1:
 102 (Peter Siddle 5/21);  196/4. Australia lead by 94 runs with 6 wickets remaining in the 1st innings.
Pakistan in Sri Lanka:
4th ODI in Colombo:
 321/5 (50 ov, Umar Akmal 102*);  175 (36.1 ov). Pakistan win by 146 runs. Sri Lanka lead the 5-match series 3–1.

Cycling
UCI ProTour:
Tour de Pologne:
Stage 6: (1) Edvald Boasson Hagen  (Team Columbia-HTC) 4h 03' 40" (2) Alessandro Ballan  same time (3) Marco Marcato  (Vacansoleil Pro Cycling Team) s.t.
General classification: (1) Ballan 25h 50' 34" (2) Daniel Moreno  + 10" (3) Hagen + 11"

Volleyball
FIVB World Grand Prix:
2nd Preliminary round:
Pool D in Miaoli, Chinese Taipei:
 3–2 
 3–1 
Pool E in Macau:
 3–0 
 3–2 
Pool F in Osaka, Japan:
 2–3 
 3–0 
Standing after 4 matches: Brazil, China, Netherlands 8 points, Russia 7, Germany, USA, Thailand 6, Poland, Japan, Dominican Republic 5, Puerto Rico, Korea 4.

August 6, 2009 (Thursday)

Basketball
African Championship in Libya: (teams in bold advance to the second round)
Group A in Benghazi:
 73–64 
 49–97 Group B in Benghazi: 69–79  67–54 
Group C in Tripoli:
 56–70  69–82 Group D in Tripoli:
 77–67 
 98–79 
Asian Championship in Tianjin, China:
Group A:
 115–31 
 95–74 
Group B:
 71–67 
 69–64 
Group C:
 62–77 
 49–121 
Group D:
 63–68 (OT) 
 67–84 

Cycling
UCI ProTour:
Tour de Pologne:
Stage 5: (1) Alessandro Ballan  3h 48' 23" (2) Daniel Moreno  same time (3) Pieter Weening  s.t.
General classification: (1) Ballan 21h 47' 00" (2) Moreno + 4" (3) Weening + 6"

Football (soccer)
UEFA Europa League Third qualifying round, second leg: (teams in bold advance to the Play-off Round, first leg result in parentheses)
Krylia Sovetov  3–2 (0–1)  St Patrick's Athletic. 3–3 on aggregate; St Patrick's Athletic win on away goals.Karabakh  2–1 (1–0)  Honka. Karabakh win 3–1 on aggregate.Košice  3–1 (2–0)  Slavija. Košice win 5–1 on aggregate.Slovan Liberec  2–0 (1–0)  Vaduz. Slovan Liberec win 3–0 on aggregate.
Cherno More  0–1 (0–1)  PSV Eindhoven. PSV Eindhoven win 2–0 on aggregate.Lech Poznań  1–2 (6–1)  Fredrikstad. Lech Poznań win 7–3 on aggregate.Hapoel Tel Aviv  1–1 (3–1)  IFK Göteborg. Hapoel Tel Aviv win 4–2 on aggregate.
Slaven Belupo  0–2 (1–2)  Tromsø. Tromsø win 4–1 on aggregate.
Lahti  1–1 (2–3)  Club Brugge. Club Brugge win 4–3 on aggregate.Lille  2–0 (2–0)  Sevojno. Lille win 4–0 on aggregate.Sturm Graz  5–0 (2–1)  Petrovac. Sturm Graz win 7–1 on aggregate.
APOP  2–2 (ET) (1–2)  Rapid Wien. Rapid Wien win 4–3 on aggregate.Austria Wien  4–2 (1–1)  Vojvodina. Austria Wien win 5–3 on aggregate.Basel  3–1 (2–2)  KR. Basel win 5–3 on aggregate.
Young Boys  1–2 (1–0)  Athletic Bilbao. 2–2 on aggregate; Athletic Bilbao win on away goals.Galatasaray  6–0 (4–1)  Maccabi Netanya. Galatasaray win 10–1 on aggregate.
Legia Warsaw  2–2 (1–1)  Brøndby. 3–3 on aggregate; Brøndby win on away goals.
Derry City  1–1 (0–1)  CSKA Sofia. CSKA Sofia win 2–1 on aggregate.
Interblock Ljubljana  0–3 (0–2)  Metalurh Donetsk. Metalurh Donetsk win 5–0 on aggregate.NAC Breda  3–1 (1–0)  Polonia Warsaw. NAC Breda win 4–1 on aggregate.
Budapest Honvéd  1–1 (1–5)  Fenerbahçe. Fenerbahçe win 6–2 on aggregate.Sigma Olomouc  3–0 (5–1)  Aberdeen. Sigma Olomouc win 8–1 on aggregate.Metalist Kharkiv  2–0 (2–1)  Rijeka. Metalist Kharkiv win 4–1 on aggregate.Elfsborg  2–0 (2–1)  Braga. Elfsborg win 4–1 on aggregate.Odense  3–0 (4–3)  Rabotnički. Odense win 7–3 on aggregate.Sarajevo  2–1 (ET)  Helsingborg. 3–3 on aggregate; Sarajevo win 5–4 in penalty shootout.Hamburg  0–1 (4–0)  Randers. Hamburg win 4–1 on aggregate.
Gent  1–7 (1–3)  Roma. Roma win 10–2 on aggregate.PAOK  0–1 (2–1)  Vålerenga. 2–2 on aggregate; PAOK win on away goals.
Motherwell  1–3 (0–3)  Steaua București. Steaua București win 6–1 on aggregate.Red Star Belgrade  5–2 (0–2)  Dinamo Tbilisi. Red Star Belgrade win 5–4 on aggregate.
Hajduk Split  0–1 (1–1)  MŠK Žilina. MŠK Žilina win 2–1 on aggregate.Fulham  3–0 (3–0)  Vėtra. Fulham win 6–0 on aggregate.
Paços de Ferreira  0–1 (0–1)  Bnei Yehuda. Bnei Yehuda win 2–0 on aggregate.
Copa Sudamericana First Stage, first leg:
Alianza Atlético  0–0  Deportivo Anzoátegui

August 5, 2009 (Wednesday)

Basketball
African Championship in Libya:
Group A in Benghazi:
 88–72 
 93–84 
Group B in Benghazi:
 79–74 
 62–72 
Group C in Tripoli:
 79–69 
 95–68 
Group D in Tripoli:
 71–52 
 85–84 
EuroBasket qualification additional qualifying round:
Group A:  56–62 
Group B:  77–80 (OT) 

Cycling
UCI ProTour:
Tour de Pologne:
Stage 4: (1) Edvald Boasson Hagen  (Team Columbia-HTC) 5h 25' 55" (2) Jürgen Roelandts  same time (3) Danilo Napolitano  (Team Katusha) s.t.
General classification: (1) Roelandts 17h 58' 31" (2) Borut Božič  (Vacansoleil Pro Cycling Team) + 6" (3) Jacopo Guarnieri  s.t.

Football (soccer)
UEFA Champions League Third qualifying round, second leg: (teams in bold advance to the Play-off Round, first leg result in parentheses)
Champions path:
BATE Borisov  2–1 (0–1)  Ventspils. 2–2 on aggregate, Ventspils win on away goals rule.Levski Sofia  2–0 (0–0)  Baku. Levski win 2–0 on aggregate.Debrecen  1–0 (1–0)  Levadia. Debrecen win 2–0 on aggregate.
Slavia Prague  1–1 (0–0)  Sheriff Tiraspol. 1–1 on aggregate, Tiraspol win on away goals rule.
Maribor  0–3 (3–2)  Zürich. Zürich win 5–3 on aggregate.
Partizan  1–0 (0–2)  APOEL. APOEL win 2–1 on aggregate.Olympiacos  2–0 (2–0)  Slovan Bratislava. Olympiacos win 4–0 on aggregate.
Stabæk  0–0 (1–3)  Copenhagen. Copenhagen win 3–1 on aggregate.
Non-champions path:
Dynamo Moscow  0–2 (1–0)  Celtic. Celtic win 2–1 on aggregate.Timişoara  0–0 (2–2)  Shakhtar Donetsk. 2–2 on aggregate, Timişoara win on away goals rule.
Copa Sudamericana First Stage, first leg:
La Equidad  2–2  Unión Española
Zamora  0–1  Emelec
North American SuperLiga Final in Bridgeview, Illinois:
Chicago Fire  1–1 (ET)  UANL. UANL win 4–3 in penalty shootout.
Copa Chile Fourth round:
Selección Rapa Nui 0–4 Colo-Colo
This is the first professional match on Easter Island. (MercoPress)

August 4, 2009 (Tuesday)

Cycling
UCI ProTour:
Tour de Pologne:
Stage 3: (1) Jacopo Guarnieri  5h 22' 31" (2) Allan Davis  s.t. (3) André Greipel  (Team Columbia-HTC) s.t.
General classification: (1) Greipel 12h 32' 42" (2) Guarnieri s.t. (3) Borut Božič  (Vacansoleil Pro Cycling Team) s.t.

Football (soccer)
UEFA Champions League Third qualifying round, second leg: (teams in bold advance to the Play-off Round, first leg result in parentheses)
Champions path:Maccabi Haifa  4–3 (0–0)  Aktobe. Haifa rally from 3 goals down to win 4–3 on aggregate.
Dinamo Zagreb  1–2 (1–1)  Red Bull Salzburg. Salzburg win 3–2 on aggregate.
Non-champions path:
Sivasspor  3–1 (0–5)  Anderlecht. Anderlecht win 6–3 on aggregate.Panathinaikos  3–0 (1–3)  Sparta Prague. Panathinaikos win 4–3 on aggregate.
Twente  1–1 (0–0)  Sporting CP. Aggregate 1–1, Sporting win on away goals rule.
UEFA Europa League Third qualifying round, second leg: (teams in bold advance to the Play-off Round, first leg result in parentheses)
Omonia  1–1 (0–2)  Vaslui. Vaslui win 3–1 on aggregate.
Copa Sudamericana First Stage, first leg:
Universidad de Chile  2–1  Deportivo Cali

Racquetball
European Championships in Paris:
Men:
Semifinals:
 0–3 
 2–1 
3rd place:
  2–1 
Final:
  2–1  
Women:
 1–2 
 0–3 
Final standing:      

August 3, 2009 (Monday)

Auto racing
Sprint Cup Series:
Pennsylvania 500 in Long Pond, Pennsylvania:
 (1) Denny Hamlin  (Toyota, Joe Gibbs Racing) (2) Juan Pablo Montoya  (Chevrolet, Earnhardt Ganassi Racing) (3) Clint Bowyer  (Chevrolet, Richard Childress Racing)
Drivers' standings (after 21 of 26 races leading to the Chase for the Sprint Cup): (1) Tony Stewart  3188 points (Chevrolet, Stewart Haas Racing) (2) Jimmie Johnson  2991 (Chevrolet, Hendrick Motorsports) (3) Jeff Gordon  2989 (Chevrolet, Hendrick Motorsports)

Cricket
Australia in England:
The Ashes Series:
3rd Test in Birmingham, day 5:
 263 & 375/5d (112.2 overs, Michael Clarke 103*);  376. Match drawn. England lead 5-match series 1–0.Pakistan in Sri Lanka:
3rd ODI in Dambulla:
 288/8 (50 ov);  289/4 (46.3 ov, Mahela Jayawardene 123). Sri Lanka win by 6 wickets, and take an unassailable 3–0 lead in the 5-match series.Cycling
UCI ProTour:
Tour de Pologne:
Stage 2: (1) Angelo Furlan  4h 57' 25" (2) Jürgen Roelandts  s.t. (3) Juan José Haedo  (Team Saxo Bank) s.t.
General classification: (1) Borut Božič  (Vacansoleil Pro Cycling Team) 7h 10' 11" (2) Furlan s.t. (3) David Loosli  (Lampre-N.G.C.) + 1"

Racquetball
European Championships in Paris:
Men: (teams in bold advance to the semifinals)
Group A:
 3–0 
 3–0 
 2–1 
Standings: Ireland 2–0, Netherlands 1–1, Belgium 0–2.
Group B:
 3–0 
 3–0 
 3–0 
 3–0 
 2–1 
 1–2 
Standings: Catalonia 3–0, Germany 2–1, Italy 1–2, France 0–3.
Women:
 1–2 

August 2, 2009 (Sunday)

Auto racing
Sprint Cup Series:
Pennsylvania 500 in Long Pond, Pennsylvania:
 Postponed to Monday due to rain.
World Rally Championship:
Rally Finland:
(1) Mikko Hirvonen  (Ford Focus RS WRC 09) 2:50:40.9 (2) Sébastien Loeb  (Citroën C4 WRC) 2:51:06.0 (3) Jari-Matti Latvala  (Ford Focus RS WRC 09) 2:51:30.8
Drivers' standings (after 9 of 12 races): (1) Hirvonen 68 points (2) Loeb 65 (3) Dani Sordo  (Citroën C4 WRC) 44
Manufacturers' standings: (1) Citroën Total World Rally Team 119 points (2) BP Ford World Rally Team 105 (3) Stobart M-Sport Ford Rally Team 64
V8 Supercars:
Norton 360 Sandown Challenge in Melbourne, Victoria:
Round 14: (1) Garth Tander  (Holden Commodore) (2) Will Davison  (Holden Commodore) (3) Craig Lowndes  (Ford Falcon)
Standings (after 14 of 26 races): (1) Whincup 1791 points (2) Davison 1674 (3) Tander 1416

Cricket
Australia in England:
The Ashes Series:
3rd Test in Birmingham, day 4:
 263 & 88/2 (28.0 ov);  376. Australia trail by 25 runs with 8 wickets remaining.
Bangladesh in West Indies:
Only T20I in Basseterre, St Kitts:
 118/9 (20/20 ov);  119/5 (16.5/20 ov). West Indies win by 5 wickets.
This is Bangladesh only loss of the tour.

Cycling
UCI ProTour:
Tour de Pologne:
Stage 1: (1) Borut Božič  (Vacansoleil Pro Cycling Team) 2h 12' 56" (2) André Greipel  (Team Columbia-HTC) s.t. (3) Francesco Gavazzi  s.t.

Football (soccer)
UEFA Under-19 Championship in Ukraine:
Final:  0–2 Ukraine win their first ever football trophy.
CAF Champions League group stage, matchday 2:
Group B:
Heartland  3–1  Monomotapa United

Golf
Women's majors:
Women's British Open in Lytham St Annes, England:
 (1) Catriona Matthew  285 (−3) (2) Karrie Webb  288 (E) (3) Paula Creamer, Christina Kim (both United States), Hee-Won Han  & Ai Miyazato  289 (+1)
 Matthew becomes the first Scot ever to win a women's major.
Senior majors:
U.S. Senior Open in Carmel, Indiana:
 (1) Fred Funk  268 (−20) (2) Joey Sindelar  274 (−14) (3) Russ Cochran  276 (−12)
 Funk wins his second senior major, and sets a new to-par scoring record for the event.
PGA Tour:
Buick Open in Grand Blanc, Michigan:
 Winner: Tiger Woods  268 (−20)
 Woods bounces back from missing the cut at the Open Championship, cruising to his fourth win of the year by three shots.
European Tour:
Czech Golf Open in Prague, Czech Republic:
 Winner: Oskar Henningsson  275 (−13)
 Henningsson collects his first career European Tour win.

Swimming
World Aquatics Championships in Rome, Italy:
Men's 50m backstroke:  Liam Tancock  24.04 WR  Junya Koga  24.24  Gerhard Zandberg  24.34
Women's 50m breaststroke:  Yuliya Yefimova  30.09 WR  Rebecca Soni  30.11  Sarah Katsoulis  30.16
Men's 400m individual medley:  Ryan Lochte  4:07.01  Tyler Clary  4:07.31  László Cseh  4:07.37
Women's 50m freestyle:  Britta Steffen  23.73 WR  Therese Alshammar  23.88  Cate Campbell  & Marleen Veldhuis  23.99
Men's 1500m freestyle:  Oussama Mellouli  14:37.28  Ryan Cochrane  14:41.38  Sun Yang  14:46.84
Women's 400m individual medley:  Katinka Hosszú  4:30.31  Kirsty Coventry  4:32.12  Stephanie Rice  4:32.29
Men's 4 × 100 m medley relay:   (Aaron Peirsol 52.19 CR, Eric Shanteau, Michael Phelps, David Walters) 3:27.28 WR   (Helge Meeuw 52.27 ER, Hendrik Feldwehr, Benjamin Starke, Paul Biedermann) 3:28.58   (Ashley Delaney, Brenton Rickard, Andrew Lauterstein, Matt Targett) 3:28.64
The world championships conclude with a total of 43 world records, the most in any swimming event in history.

Tennis
ATP World Tour:
Allianz Suisse Open Gstaad in Gstaad, Switzerland:
Final: Thomaz Bellucci  bt Andreas Beck  6–4, 7–6 (2)
Bellucci wins his first ATP Tour title.
LA Tennis Open in Los Angeles, United States:
Final: Sam Querrey  bt Carsten Ball  6–4, 3–6, 6–1
Querrey wins his first title of the year and second of his career.
ATP Studena Croatia Open Umag in Umag, Croatia
Final: Nikolay Davydenko  bt Juan Carlos Ferrero  6–3, 6–0
Davydenko wins his second title of the year and 16th of his career.
WTA Tour:
Bank of the West Classic in Stanford, California, United States:
Final: Marion Bartoli  bt Venus Williams  6–2, 5–7, 6–4
Bartoli wins her second title of the year and fifth of her career.
Istanbul Cup in Istanbul, Turkey:
Final: Vera Dushevina  bt Lucie Hradecká  6–0, 6–1
Dushevina wins her first WTA Tour title.

Volleyball
FIVB World Grand Prix:
1st Preliminary round:
Pool A in Rio de Janeiro, Brazil:
 3–0 
 2–3 
Pool B in Kielce, Poland:
 3–0 
 3–1 
Pool C in Ningbo, China:
 2–3 
 3–2 
Standings after 3 matches: Brazil, China, Netherlands 6 points, Russia, Germany, Thailand  5, Poland, Dominican Republic, USA 4, Puerto Rico, Japan, Korea 3.

August 1, 2009 (Saturday)

Auto racing
IndyCar Series:
Meijer Indy 300 in Sparta, Kentucky:
(1) Ryan Briscoe  (Penske Racing) 1:28:24.3246 (2) Ed Carpenter  (Vision Racing) + 0.0162* (3) Tony Kanaan  (Andretti Green Racing)
Drivers' standings (after 12 of 17 races): (1) Briscoe 416 points (2) Scott Dixon  (Chip Ganassi Racing) 408 (3) Dario Franchitti  (Chip Ganassi Racing) 405
Nationwide Series:
U.S. Cellular 250 in Newton, Iowa:
(1) Brad Keselowski  (Chevrolet, JR Motorsports) (2) Kyle Busch  (Toyota, Joe Gibbs Racing) (3) Jason Leffler  (Toyota, Braun Racing)
V8 Supercars:
Norton 360 Sandown Challenge in Melbourne, Victoria:
Round 13: (1) Will Davison  (Holden Commodore) (2) James Courtney  (Ford Falcon) (3) Craig Lowndes  (Ford Falcon)
Standings (after 13 of 26 races): (1) Jamie Whincup  (Ford Falcon) 1662 points (2) Davison 1536 (3) Garth Tander  (Holden Commodore) 1266

Cricket
Australia in England:
The Ashes Series:
3rd Test in Birmingham, day 3:
No play due to rain.
Pakistan in Sri Lanka:
2nd ODI in Dambulla:
 168 (47 ov);  169/4 (43.4 ov). Sri Lanka win by 6 wickets. Sri Lanka lead the 5-match series 2–0Cycling
UCI ProTour:
Clásica de San Sebastián:
(1) Carlos Barredo  5h 37' 00" (2) Roman Kreuziger  s.t. (3) Mickaël Delage  + 7"

Football (soccer)
CAF Champions League group stage, matchday 2:
Group A:
Kano Pillars  3–1  Al-Merreikh
Group B:
Etoile du Sahel  2–1  TP Mazembe

Golf
Women's majors:
Women's British Open in Lytham St Annes, England, third round:
Leaderboard: (1) Catriona Matthew  212 (−4) (2) Christina Kim  215 (−1) (3) Jiyai Shin  & Ai Miyazato  216 (E)
Senior majors:
U.S. Senior Open in Carmel, Indiana, third round:
Leaderboard: (1) Fred Funk  203 (−13) (2) Greg Norman  & Joey Sindelar  204 (−12)

Rugby union
Tri Nations Series:
 31–19  in Durban
 Morné Steyn scores all of the Springboks' points, breaking the record of former All Black Andrew Mehrtens for most individual points in a Tri Nations match. Also, the Boks' John Smit makes his 60th appearance as a Test captain, giving him sole possession of the all-time lead.
 Standings:''' South Africa 8 points (2 matches), New Zealand 4 (3 matches),  1 (1 match).

Swimming
World Aquatics Championships in Rome, Italy:
Women's 50m butterfly:  Marieke Guehrer  25.48  Zhou Yafei  25.57  Ingvild Snildal  25.58
Men's 50m freestyle:  César Cielo Filho  21.08 CR AM  Frédérick Bousquet  21.21  Amaury Leveaux  21.25
Women's 200m backstroke:  Kirsty Coventry  2:04.81 WR  Anastasia Zuyeva  2:04.94  Elisabeth Beisel  2:06.39
Men's 100m butterfly:  Michael Phelps  49.82 WR  Milorad Čavić  49.95  Rafael Muñoz  50.41
Women's 800m freestyle:  Lotte Friis  8:15.92 CR  Joanne Jackson  8:16.66  Alessia Filippi  8:17.21
Women's 4 × 100 m medley relay:   (Zhao Jing, Chen Huijia, Jiao Liuyang, Li Zhesi) 3:52.19 WR   (Emily Seebohm, Sarah Katsoulis, Jessicah Schipper, Lisbeth Trickett)  3:52.58   (Daniela Samulski, Sarah Poewe, Annika Mehlhorn, Britta Steffen) 3:55.79 ER
Men's 50m backstroke semifinals: (1) Liam Tancock  24.08 WR
Women's 50m breaststroke semifinals: (1) Sarah Katsoulis  30.33
Women's 50m freestyle semifinals: (1) Cate Campbell  24.08

Volleyball
FIVB World Grand Prix:
1st Preliminary round:
Pool A in Rio de Janeiro, Brazil:
 3–0 
 2–3 
Pool B in Kielce, Poland:
 0–3 
 3–2 
Pool C in Ningbo, China:
 2–3 
 3–0 
China, Brazil, Netherlands, Russia and Thailand all win their two opening matches.

Water polo
World Aquatics Championships in Rome, Italy:
Men:
Bronze Medal Match:    8–6  
Gold Medal Match:    7–7 (Pen 7–6)

References

8